= Sundial (Olympic Mountains) =

Mountain in Washington (state), United States

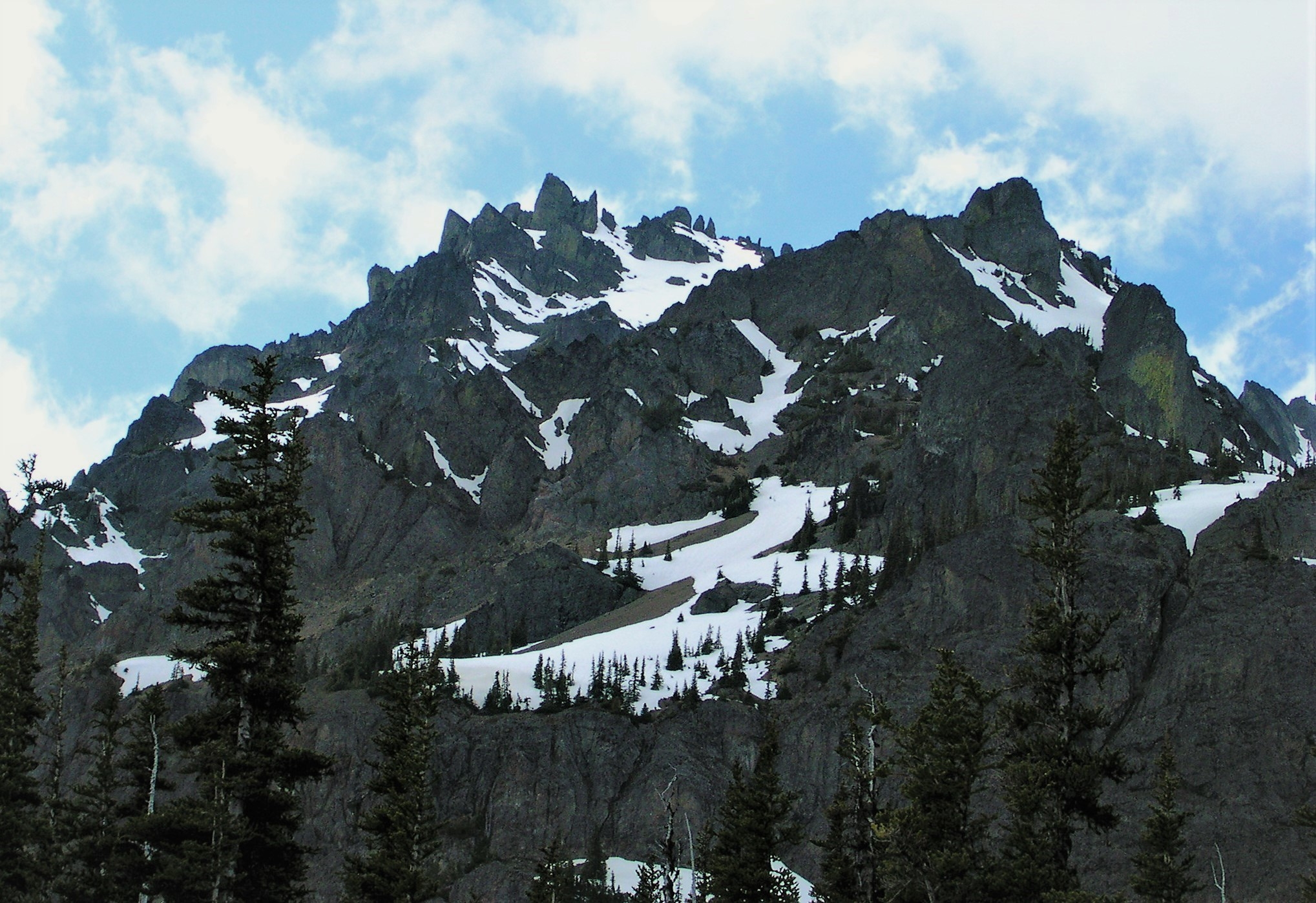
- East aspect, from Royal Basin

Highest point
- Elevation: 7,200 ft (2,200 m)
- Prominence: 80 ft (24 m)
- Parent peak: Mount Clark (7,528 ft)
- Isolation: 0.27 mi (0.43 km)
- Coordinates: 47°49′59″N 123°13′40″W

Geography
- Location within Washington (state) Location within the United States
- Location: Olympic National Park; Jefferson County, Washington, US
- Parent range: Olympic Mountains
- Topo map: USGS Mount Deception

Geology
- Rock age: Eocene
- Rock type: basalt

Climbing
- First ascent: 1944 by Adel Degenhardt, William Degenhardt
- Easiest route: class 3 scrambling East Face

Sundial is a 7,200+ ft (2,190+ m) mountain summit located within Olympic National Park, in Jefferson County of Washington state. Sundial is part of The Needles range, which is a subrange of the Olympic Mountains. Its nearest higher neighbor is Mount Clark, 0.27 mi (0.43 km) to the northwest, and Mount Johnson is set 0.45 mi (0.72 km) to the west. The climbing routes on Sundial start at class 3 scrambling via the East Face, and range up to class 5 via the South Side Face. The first ascent of the mountain was made in 1944 by Adel and William Degenhardt. The mountain is so named because the time of day can be approximated as an observer in Royal Basin watches the sun's rays make their way down the east face of this mountain in the morning. Precipitation runoff from the mountain drains into Royal Creek which is a tributary of the Dungeness River.

== Climate ==
Based on the Köppen climate classification, Sundial is located in the marine west coast climate zone of western North America. Most weather fronts originate in the Pacific Ocean, and travel northeast toward the Olympic Mountains. As fronts approach, they are forced upward by the peaks of the Olympic Range, causing them to drop their moisture in the form of rain or snowfall (Orographic lift). As a result, the Olympics experience high precipitation, especially during the winter months. During winter months, weather is usually cloudy, but, due to high pressure systems over the Pacific Ocean that intensify during summer months, there is often little or no cloud cover during the summer. The months July through September offer the most favorable weather for climbing or viewing this peak.

== Geology ==
The Olympic Mountains are composed of obducted clastic wedge material and oceanic crust, primarily Eocene sandstone, turbidite, and basaltic oceanic crust. The mountains were sculpted during the Pleistocene era by erosion and glaciers advancing and retreating multiple times.

== Gallery ==
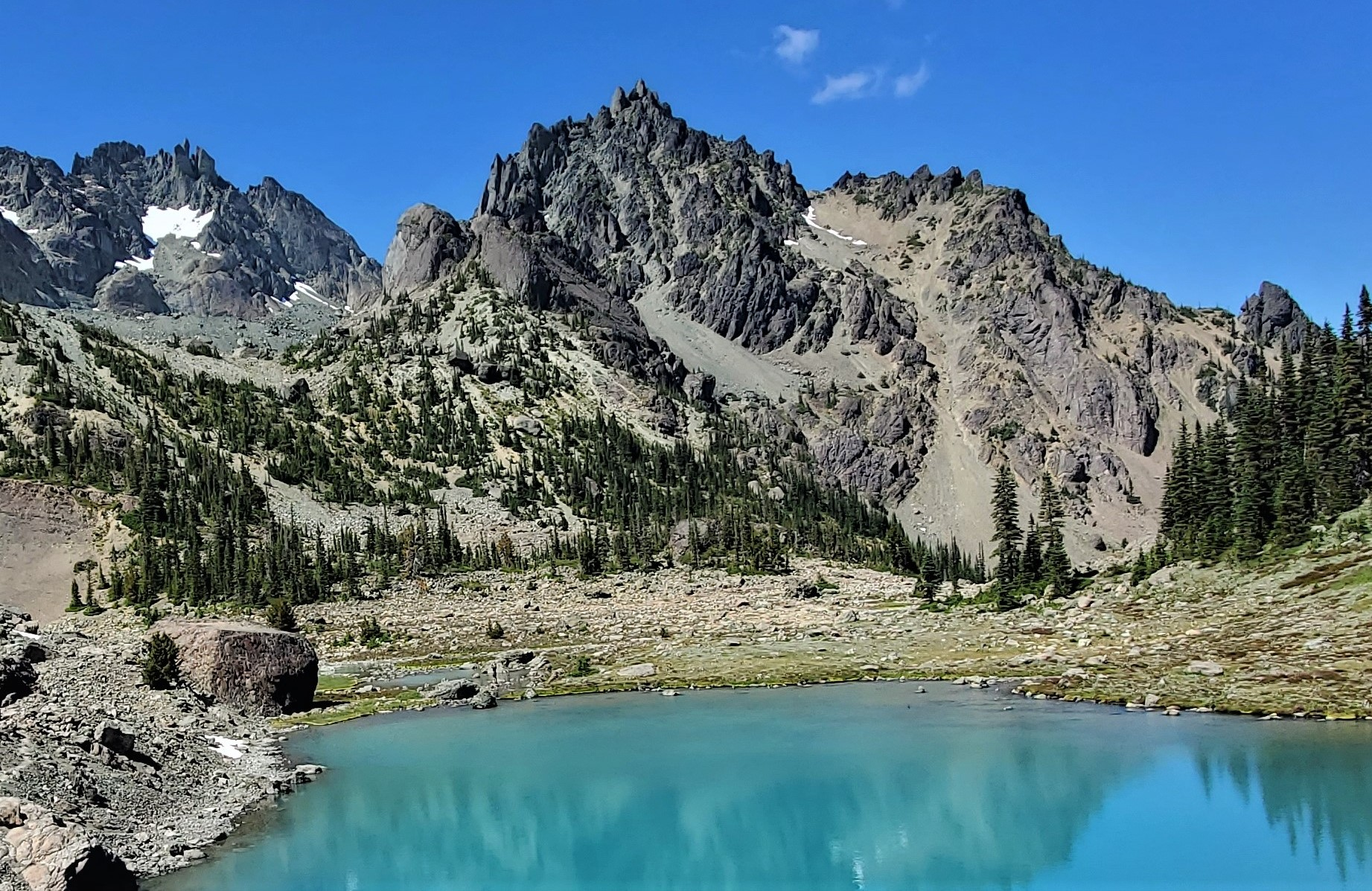
Sundial centered. Mt. Johnson and Sweat Spire to left

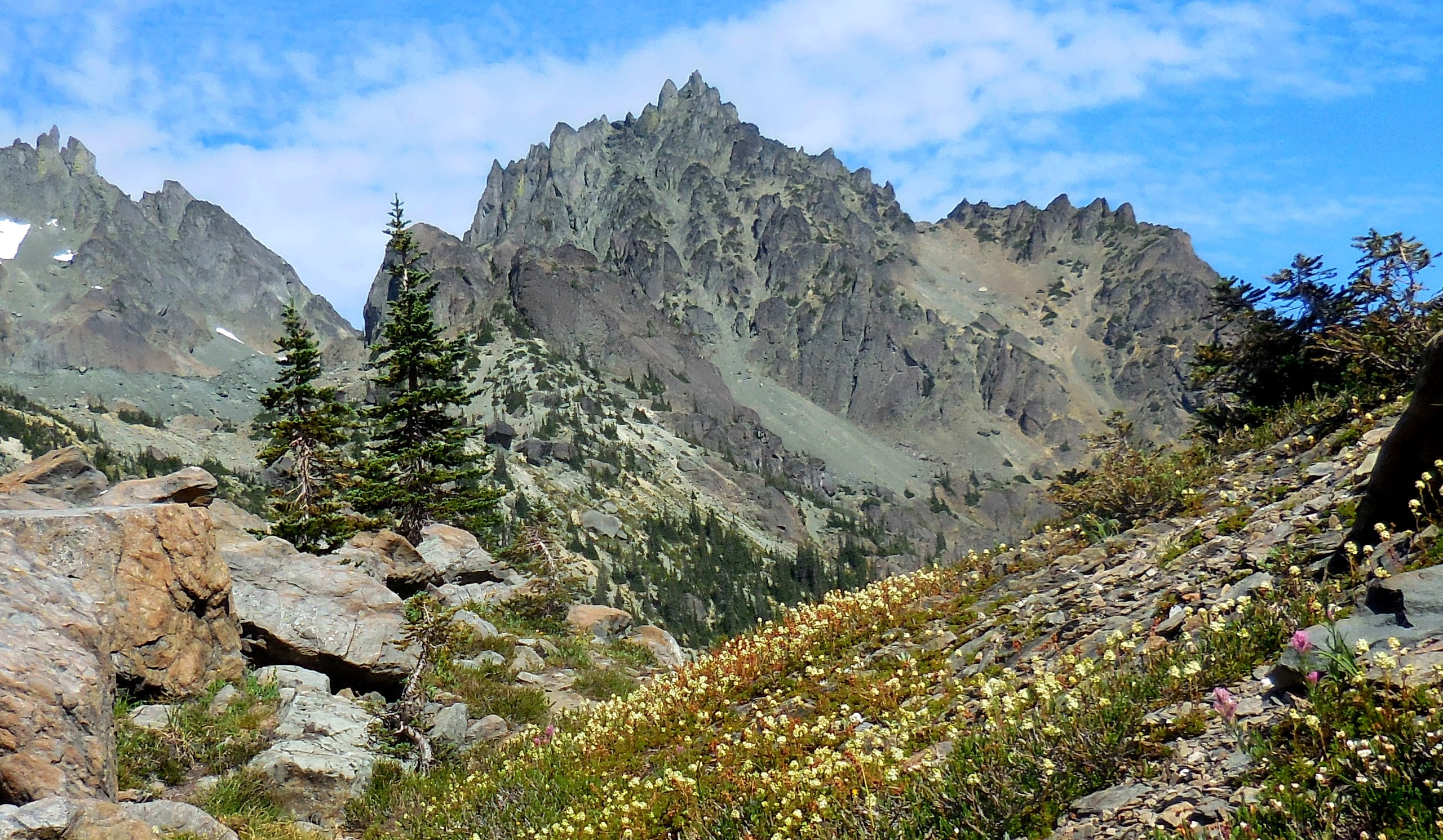
Sundial, from the southeast

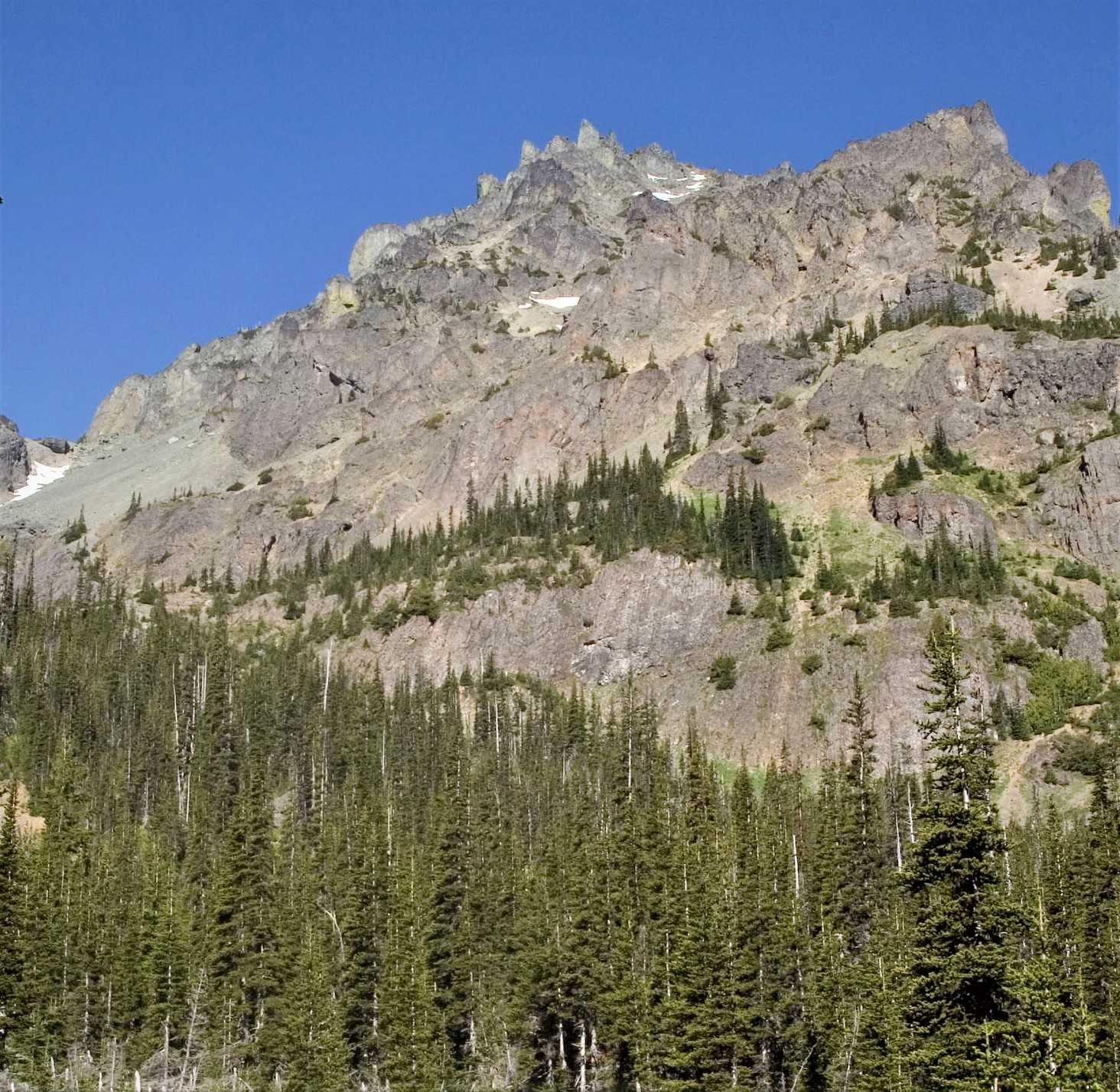
Sundial in The Needles

== See also ==
- Martin Peak
- Mount Walkinshaw
- Geology of the Pacific Northwest
