= Martin Peak (Olympic Mountains) =

Mountain in Washington (state), United States

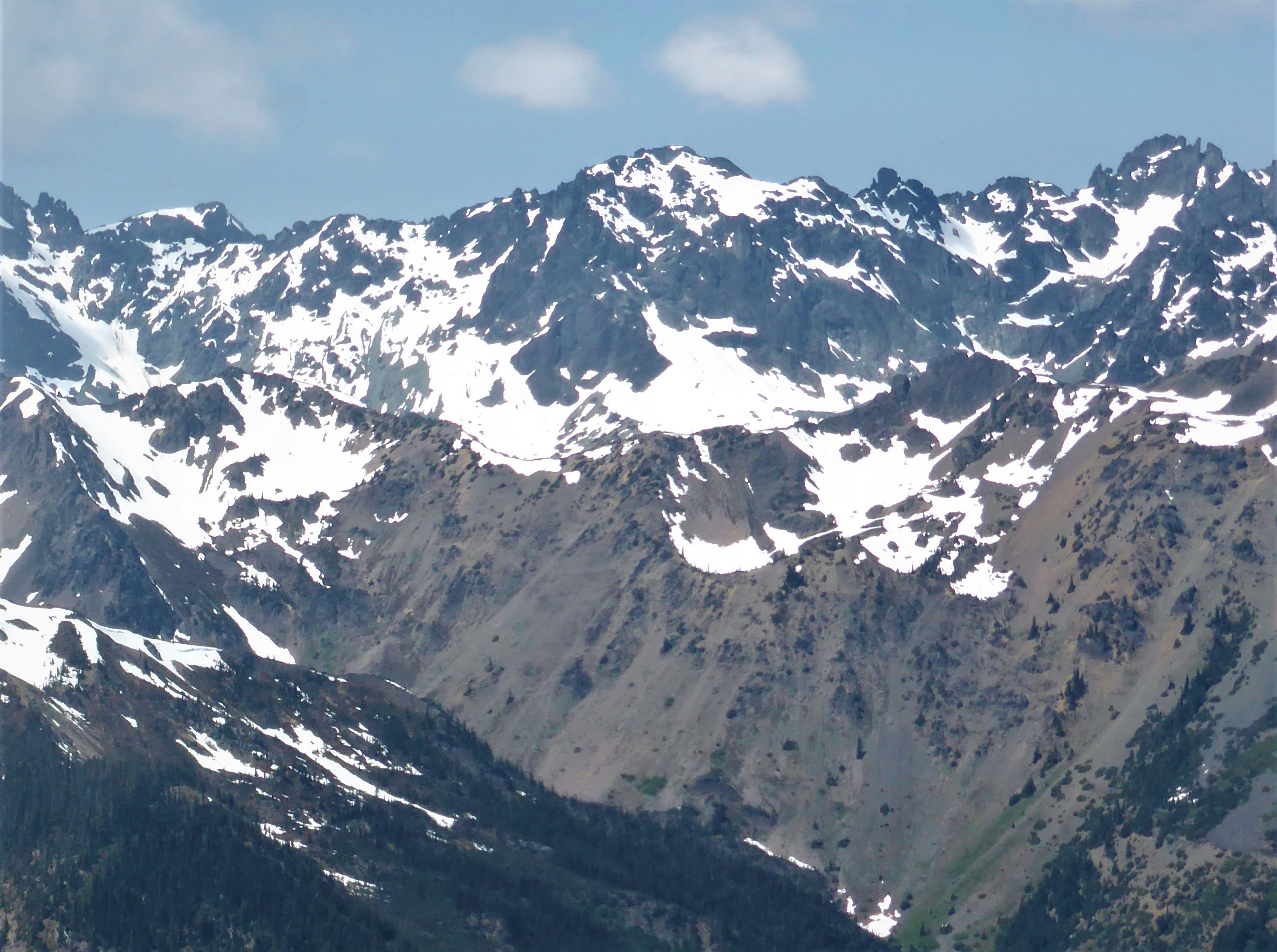
- Martin Peak centered, from east. (Mt. Johnson to right)

Highest point
- Elevation: 7,638 ft (2,328 m)
- Prominence: 238 ft (73 m)
- Parent peak: Mount Johnson
- Isolation: 0.54 mi (0.87 km)
- Coordinates: 47°49′31″N 123°14′01″W

Geography
- Location within Washington (state) Location within the United States
- Country: United States
- State: Washington
- County: Jefferson
- Protected area: Olympic National Park
- Parent range: Olympic Mountains
- Topo map: USGS Mount Deception

Geology
- Rock age: Eocene

Climbing
- First ascent: 1940
- Easiest route: class 3 scramble

Martin Peak is a mountain summit in the Olympic Mountains and is located in Jefferson County of Washington state. It is located within Olympic National Park. At 7,638 feet (2,328 m) high, Martin Peak is the seventh-highest peak of the Olympic Mountains, and the second-highest peak in The Needles range, which is a subset of the Olympic range. Its nearest higher neighbor is Mount Johnson, 0.53 mi (0.85 km) to the north-northwest. Precipitation runoff from this peak drains west into headwaters of Gray Wolf River, or east into Royal Creek, both of which are part of the Dungeness River drainage basin. Martin Peak was given its name based on the first ascent in 1940 by George W. Martin (1901–1970), and Elvin Johnson.

== Climate ==
Martin Peak is located in the marine west coast climate zone of western North America. Weather fronts originating in the Pacific Ocean travel northeast toward the Olympic Mountains. As fronts approach, they are forced upward by the peaks (orographic lift), causing them to drop their moisture in the form of rain or snow. As a result, the Olympics experience high precipitation, especially during the winter months in the form of snowfall. Because of maritime influence, snow tends to be wet and heavy, resulting in avalanche danger. During winter months weather is usually cloudy, but due to high pressure systems over the Pacific Ocean that intensify during summer months, there is often little or no cloud cover during the summer. The months July through September offer the most favorable weather for viewing and climbing this peak.

== Geology ==
The Olympic Mountains are composed of obducted clastic wedge material and oceanic crust, primarily Eocene sandstone, turbidite, and basaltic oceanic crust. The mountains were sculpted during the Pleistocene era by erosion and glaciers advancing and retreating multiple times.

== See also ==
- Gray Wolf Ridge
- Geology of the Pacific Northwest
- Mount Deception

== Gallery ==
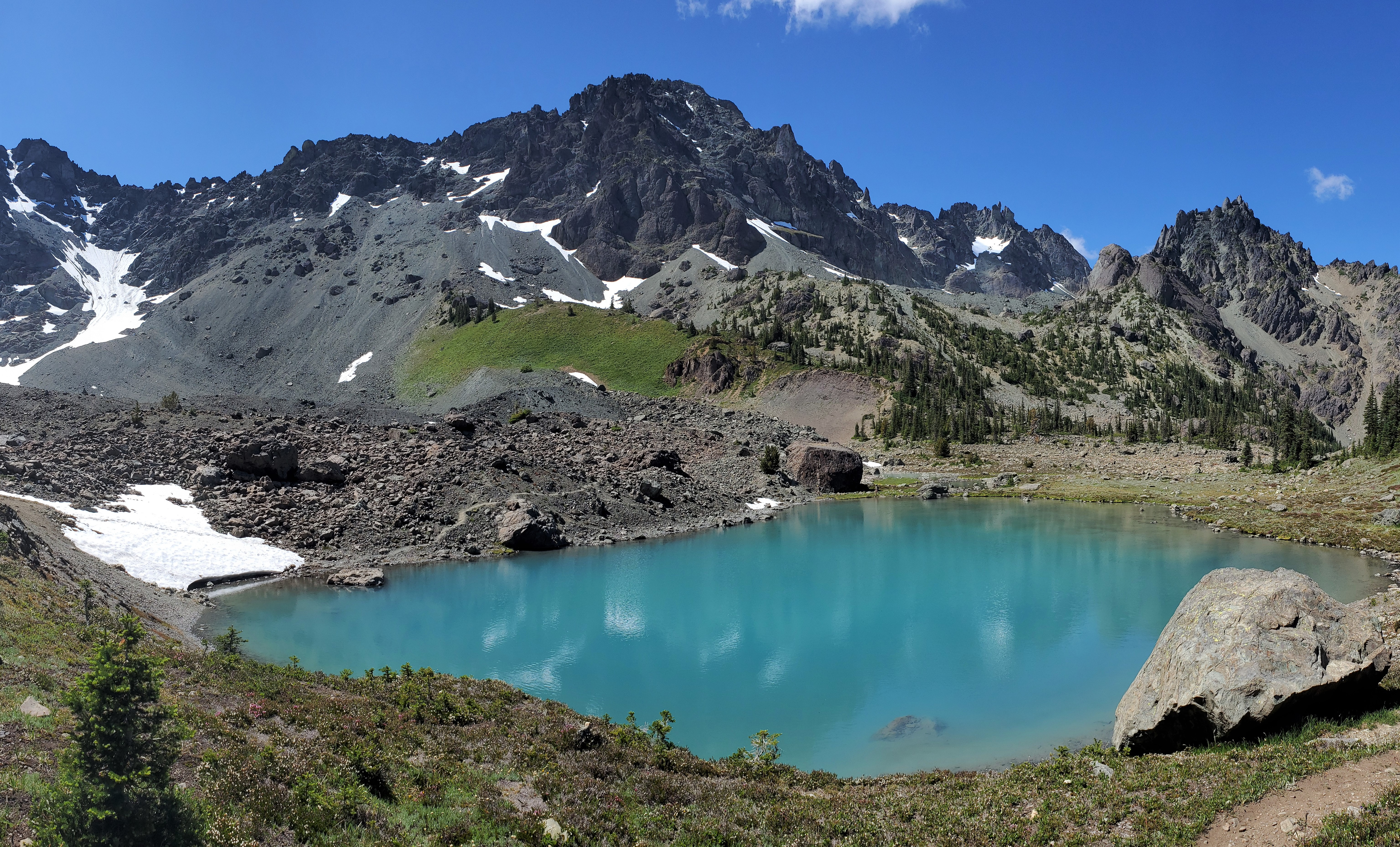
East aspect. {Sundial to right)

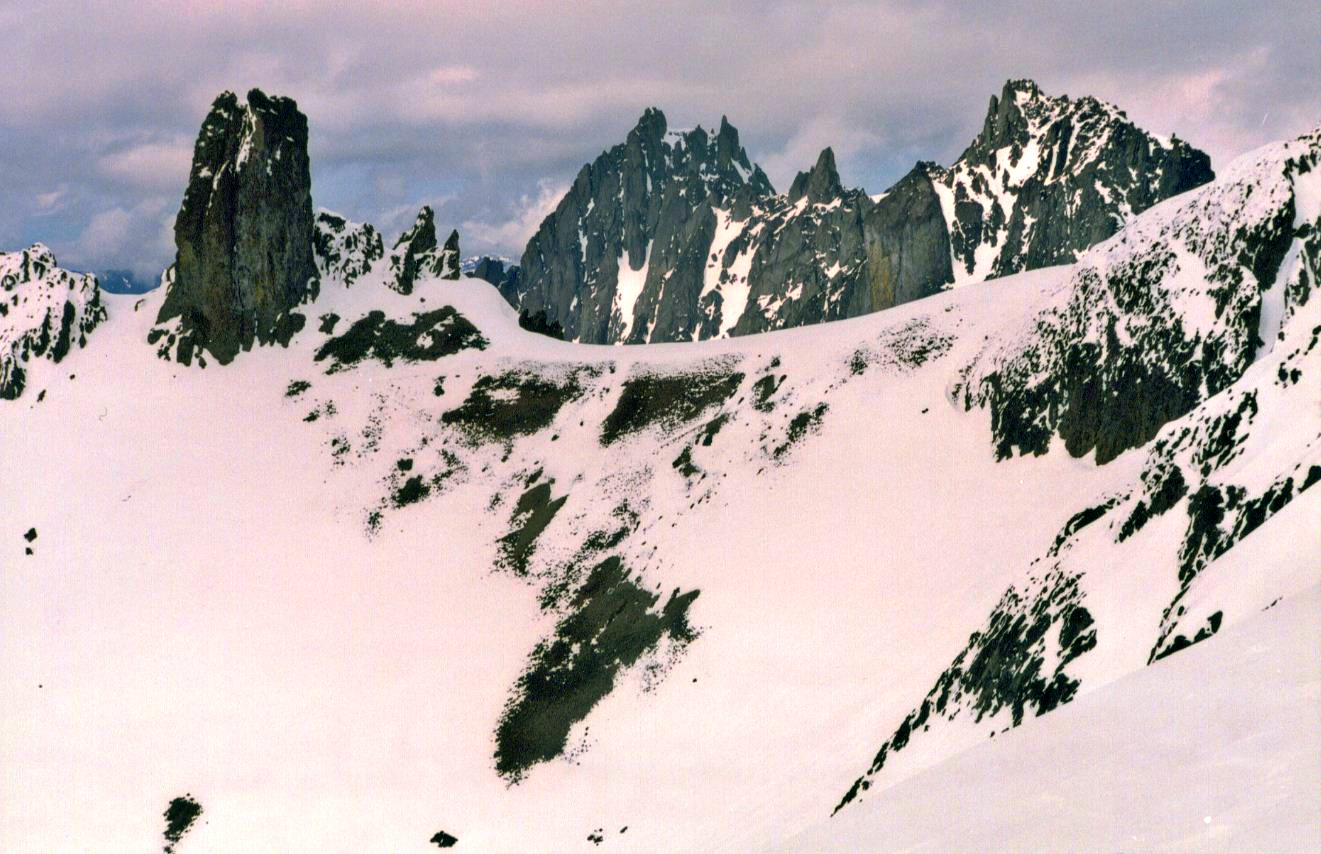
Martin Peak (right) seen with Gilhooley Tower and Mt. Johnson

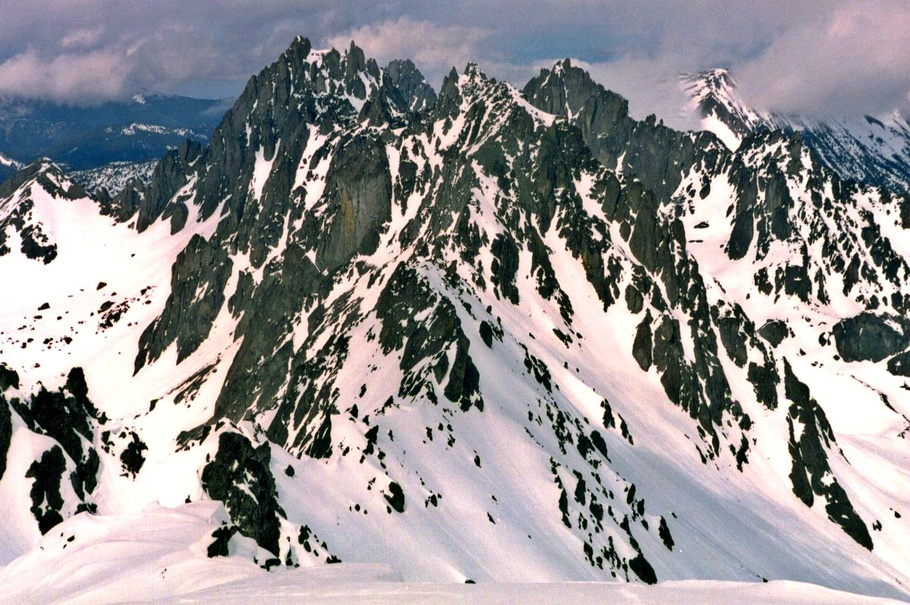
The Needles from Mount Deception. Martin Peak front and center

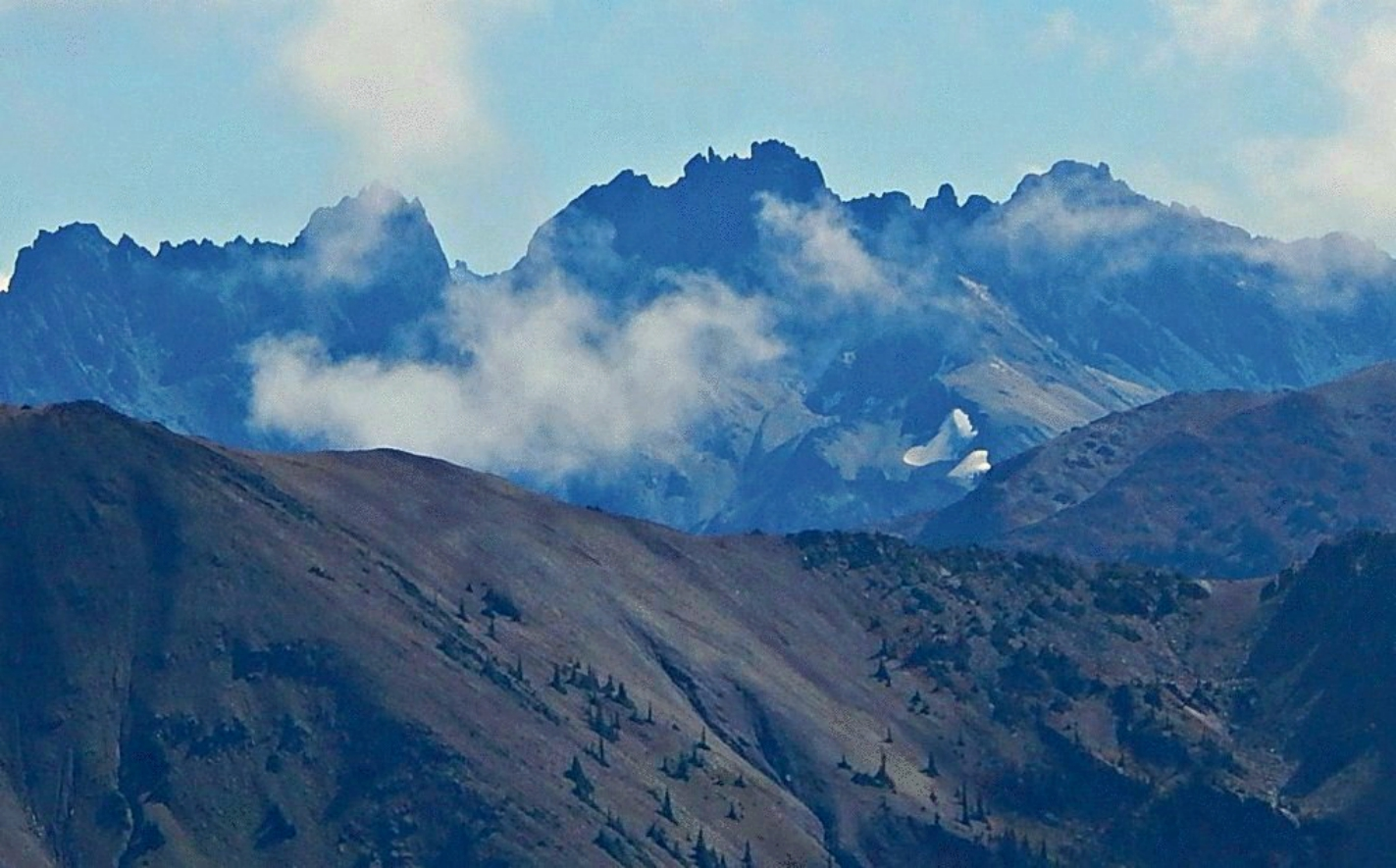
Martin Peak to right, from northwest
