= The Needles (Olympic Mountains) =

Mountain in Washington (state), United States

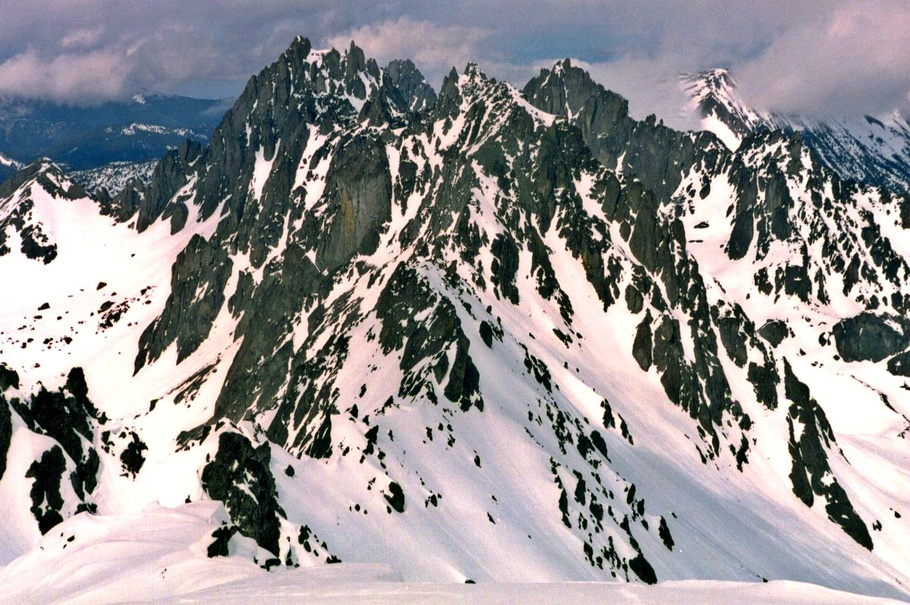
- The Needles seen from Mt. Deception

Highest point
- Peak: Mount Johnson
- Elevation: 7,680 ft (2,340 m)
- Coordinates: 47°49′57″N 123°14′14″W

Dimensions
- Length: 2 mi (3.2 km) North-South
- Width: 1 mi (1.6 km) East-West

Geography
- Location within Washington (state) Location within the United States
- Location: Olympic National Park; Jefferson County, Washington
- Country: United States
- State: Washington
- Range coordinates: 47°53′21″N 123°38′43″W
- Parent range: Olympic Mountains
- Topo map: USGS Mount Deception

Geology
- Rock age: Eocene

The Needles is a mountain ridge located within Olympic National Park in Jefferson County of Washington state.

== Description ==
The peaks and pinnacles of The Needles are part of the Olympic Mountains and are situated within the Daniel J. Evans Wilderness. They are bounded by Mount Deception to the south and Gray Wolf Ridge to the north. Precipitation runoff from the ridge drains east into Royal Creek, and west into Gray Wolf River, which are both within the Dungeness River drainage basin. Old-growth forests of Douglas fir, western hemlock, and western redcedar grow on the lower slopes surrounding the peaks.

== History ==
This geographical feature's descriptive name has been officially adopted by the U.S. Board on Geographic Names. The 1889–90 Seattle Press Expedition originally named it the "Holmes Range". The expedition, led by James Halbold Christie and Charles Adams Barnes, had also christened Mount Deception as "Mount Holmes", in honor of John H. Holmes of the Boston Herald.

== Climate ==
Based on the Köppen climate classification, the Needles range is located in the marine west coast climate zone of western North America. Most weather fronts originate in the Pacific Ocean, and travel east toward the Olympic Peninsula. As fronts approach, they are forced upward by the peaks, causing moisture to drop in the form of rain or snowfall (Orographic lift). As a result, the range experiences high precipitation, especially during the winter months. During winter months, weather is usually cloudy, but due to high pressure systems over the Pacific Ocean that intensify during summer months, there is often little or no cloud cover during the summer. The months July through September offer the most favorable weather for visiting The Needles.

== Summits ==
Principal summits of The Needles:

Name	Elevation	Prominence	First ascent	Reference
Mount Johnson	7,680 ft	480 ft	1940	
Martin Peak	7,638 ft	238 ft	1940	
Devil's Fang	7,600 ft	unknown	1972	
Sweat Spire	7,560 ft	unknown	1962	
Mount Clark	7,528 ft	608 ft	1940	
Gasp Pinnacle	7,520 ft	40 ft	1958	
The Incisor	7,440 ft	40 ft	1958	
Mount Walkinshaw	7,378 ft	378 ft	1961	
Adelaide Peak	7,300 ft	120 ft	1944	
Sundial	7,200 ft	80 ft	1944	
The Arrowhead	7,160 ft	unknown	1962	

== Gallery ==
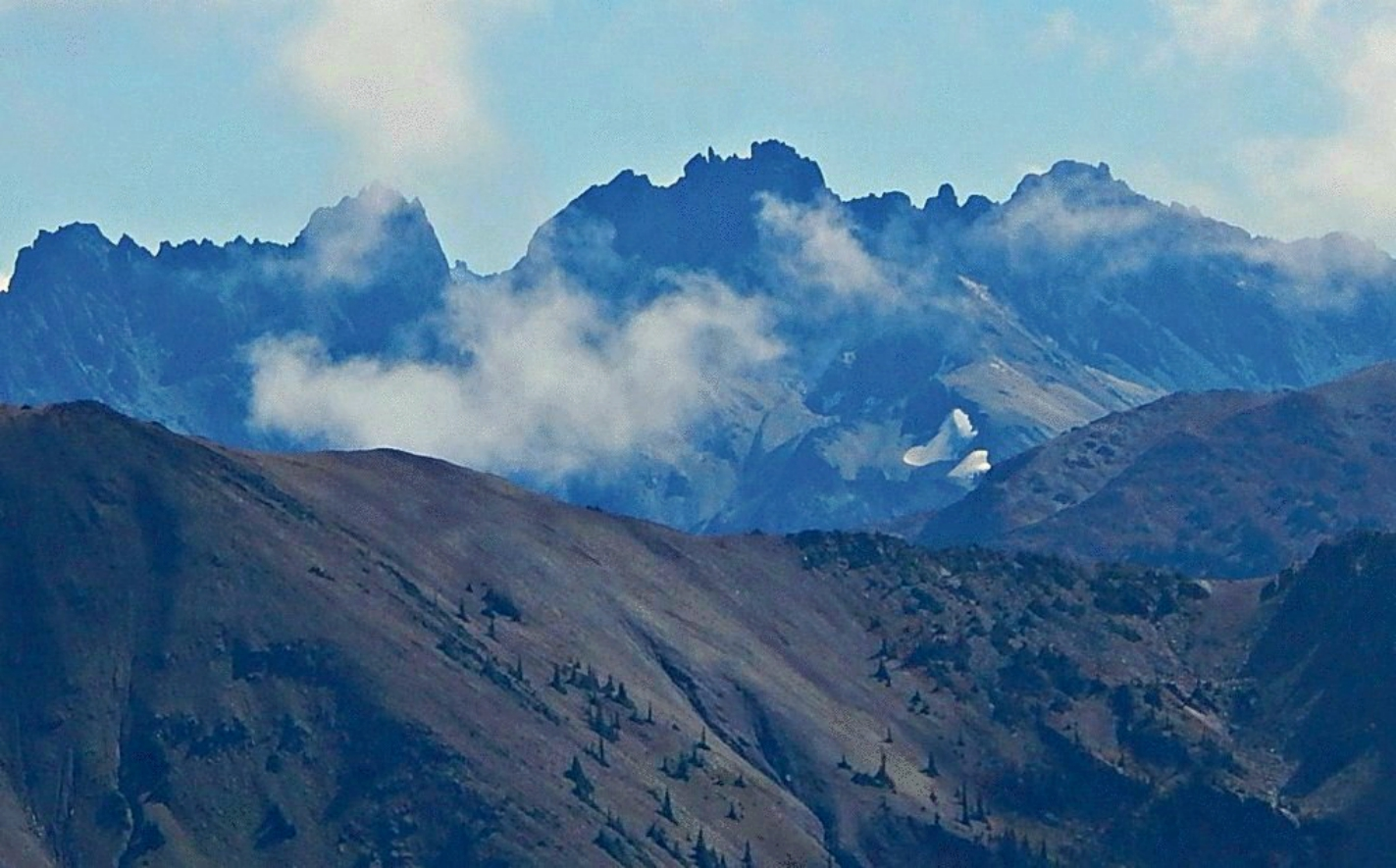
The Needles seen from Obstruction Peak

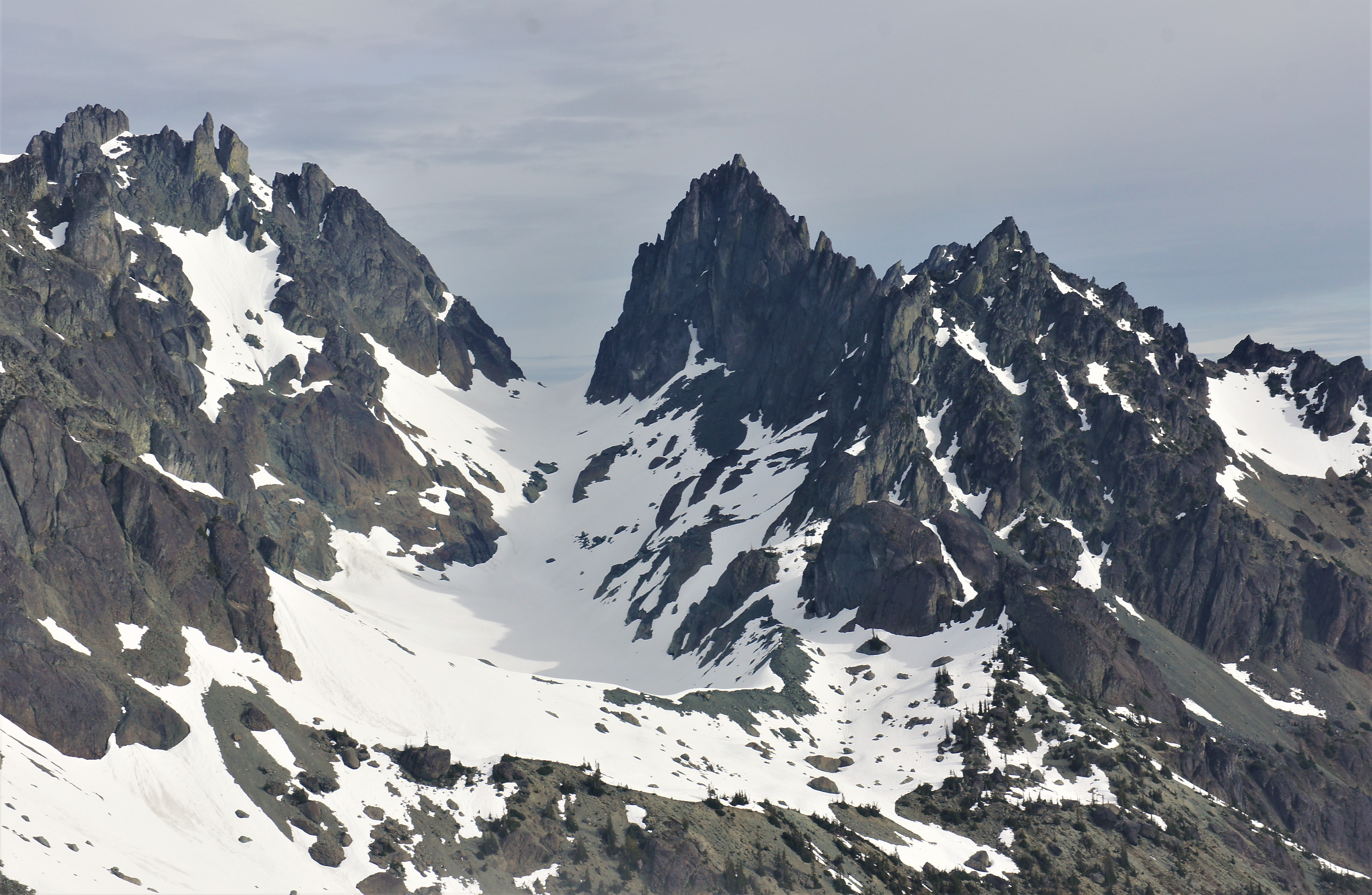
Johnson, Sweat Spire, Gasp Pinnacle to left. Clark and Sundial to right.

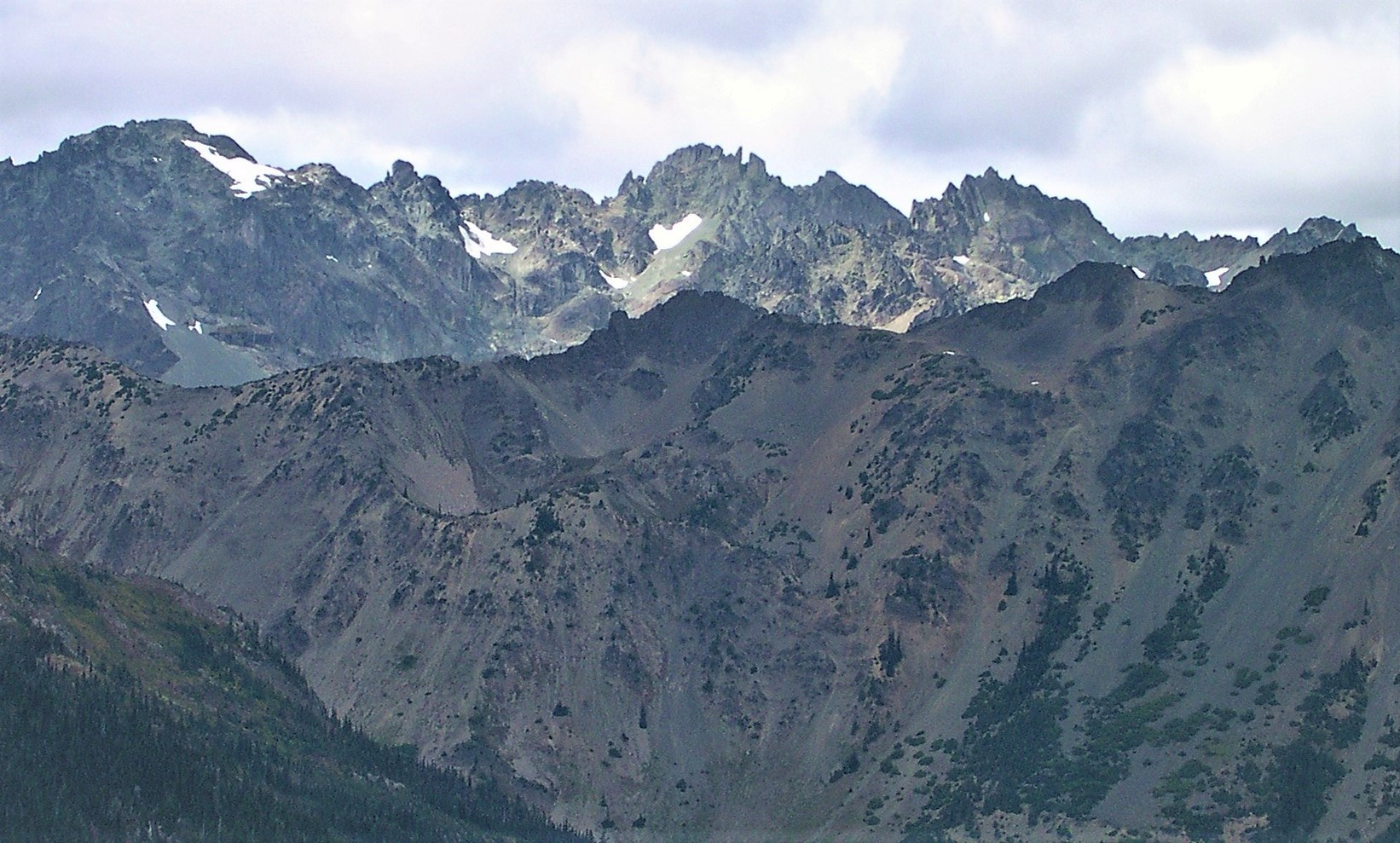
Martin, Incisor, Johnson, Clark, and Sundial seen from Marmot Pass

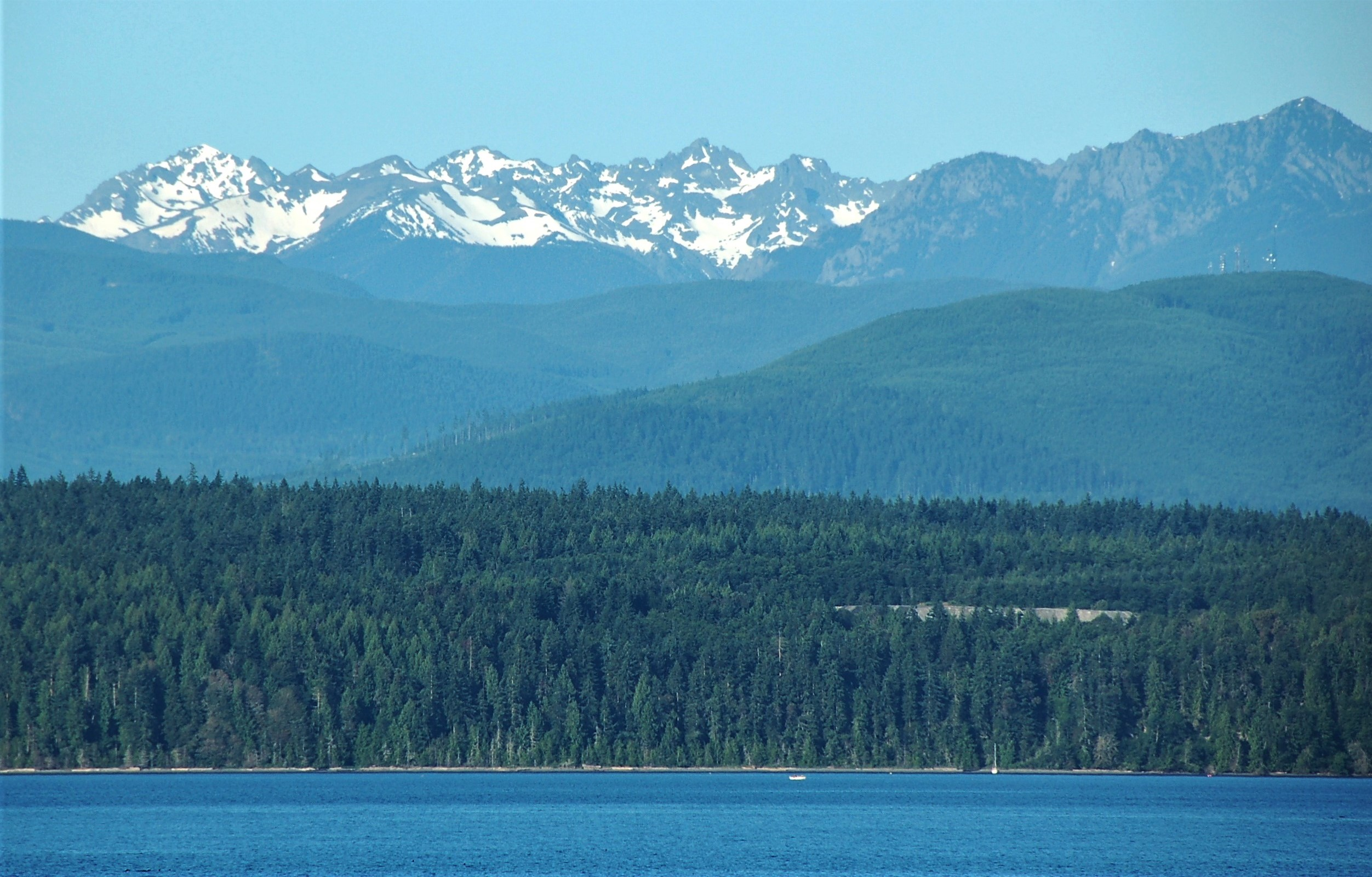
Mt. Deception (left), The Needles centered, Tyler Peak along right edge,
as seen from near Port Townsend

== Geology ==
The Olympic Mountains are composed of obducted clastic wedge material and oceanic crust, primarily Eocene sandstone, turbidite, and basaltic oceanic crust. The mountains were sculpted during the Pleistocene era by erosion and glaciers advancing and retreating multiple times.

== See also ==
- Geology of the Pacific Northwest
