= Gilhooley Tower =

Basalt spire in Jefferson County, Washington

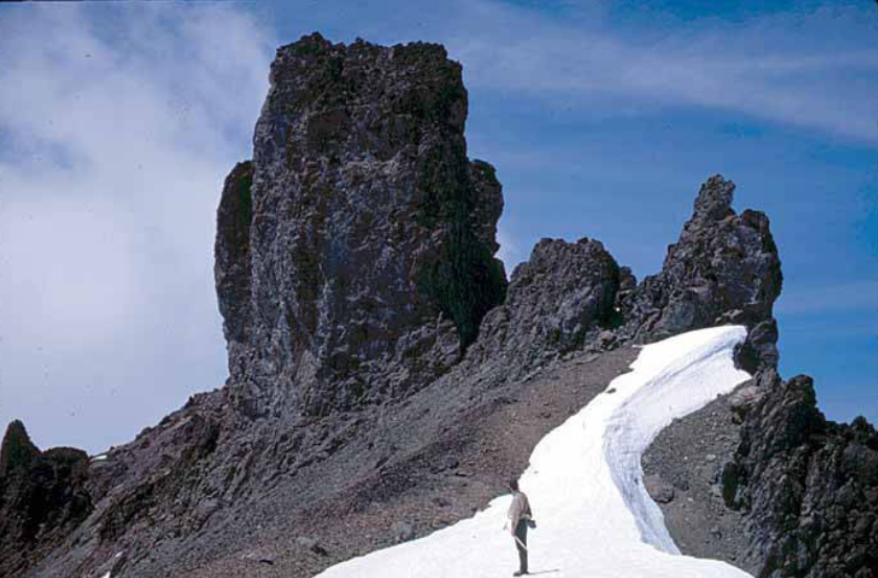
- Gilhooley Tower

Highest point
- Elevation: 7,480 ft (2,280 m)
- Prominence: 120 ft (37 m)
- Parent peak: Mount Deception
- Isolation: 0.25 mi (0.40 km)
- Coordinates: 47°48′58″N 123°14′14″W

Geography
- Location within Washington (state) Location within the United States
- Country: United States
- State: Washington
- County: Jefferson
- Protected area: Olympic National Park
- Parent range: Olympic Mountains
- Topo map: USGS Mount Deception

Geology
- Rock age: Eocene
- Rock type: Basalt

Climbing
- First ascent: 1963 by Donald Anderson, Harold Pinsch, Joyce Pinsch
- Easiest route: Climbing class 4

Gilhooley Tower is a basalt spire in the Olympic Mountains and is located in Jefferson County of Washington state. It is situated in Olympic National Park on the Olympic Peninsula. Its nearest higher peak is Mount Deception at 0.13 mi (0.21 km) to the southeast. Precipitation runoff drains into tributaries of the Dungeness River and Dosewallips River.

== Climate ==
Based on the Köppen climate classification, Gilhooley Tower is located in the marine west coast climate zone of western North America. Weather fronts originating in the Pacific Ocean travel northeast toward the Olympic Mountains. As fronts approach, they are forced upward by the peaks (orographic lift), causing them to drop their moisture in the form of rain or snow. As a result, the Olympics experience high precipitation, especially during the winter months in the form of snowfall. Because of maritime influence, snow tends to be wet and heavy, resulting in avalanche danger. During winter months weather is usually cloudy, but due to high pressure systems over the Pacific Ocean that intensify during summer months, there is often little or no cloud cover during the summer.

== Gallery ==
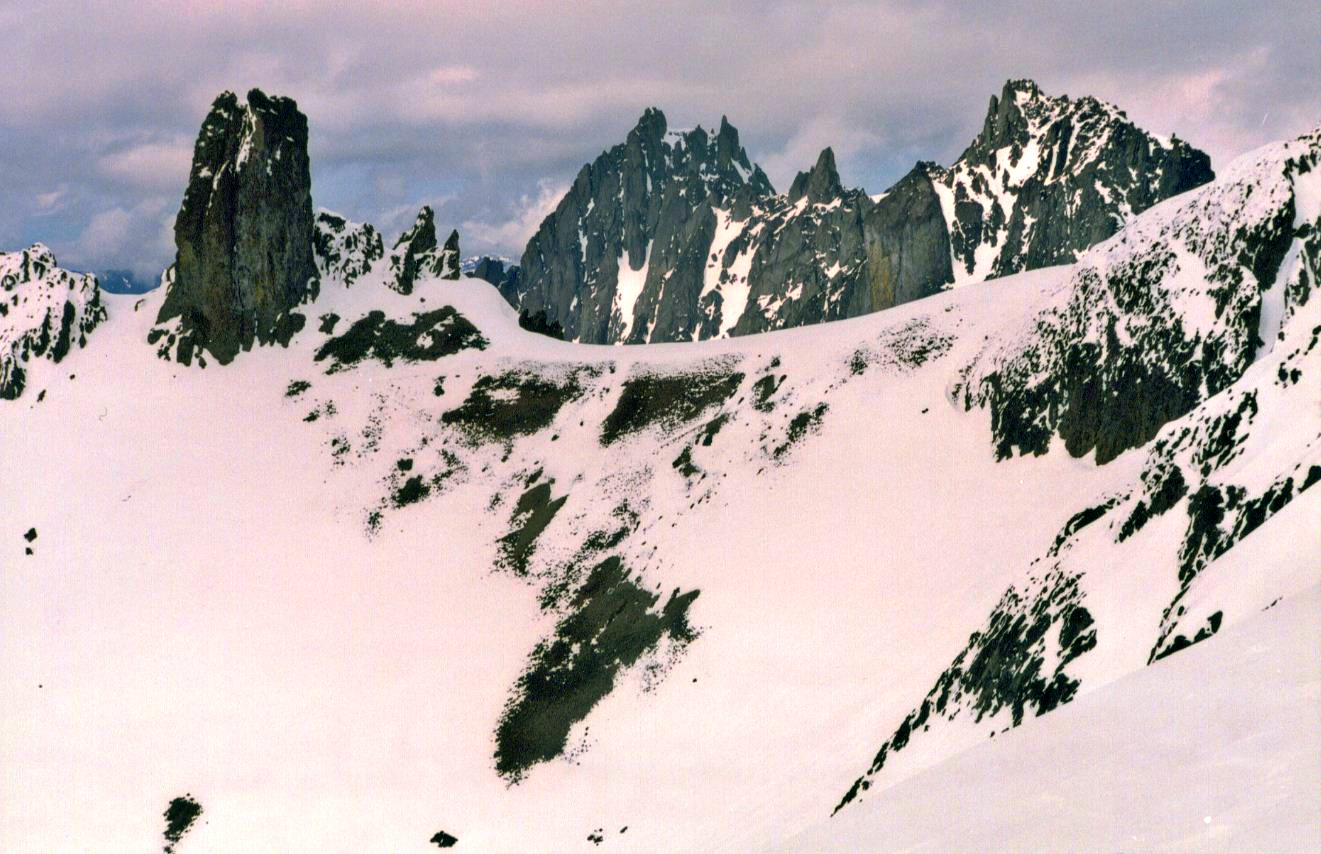
Gilhooley Tower upper left. Mount Johnson centered, and Martin Peak to right

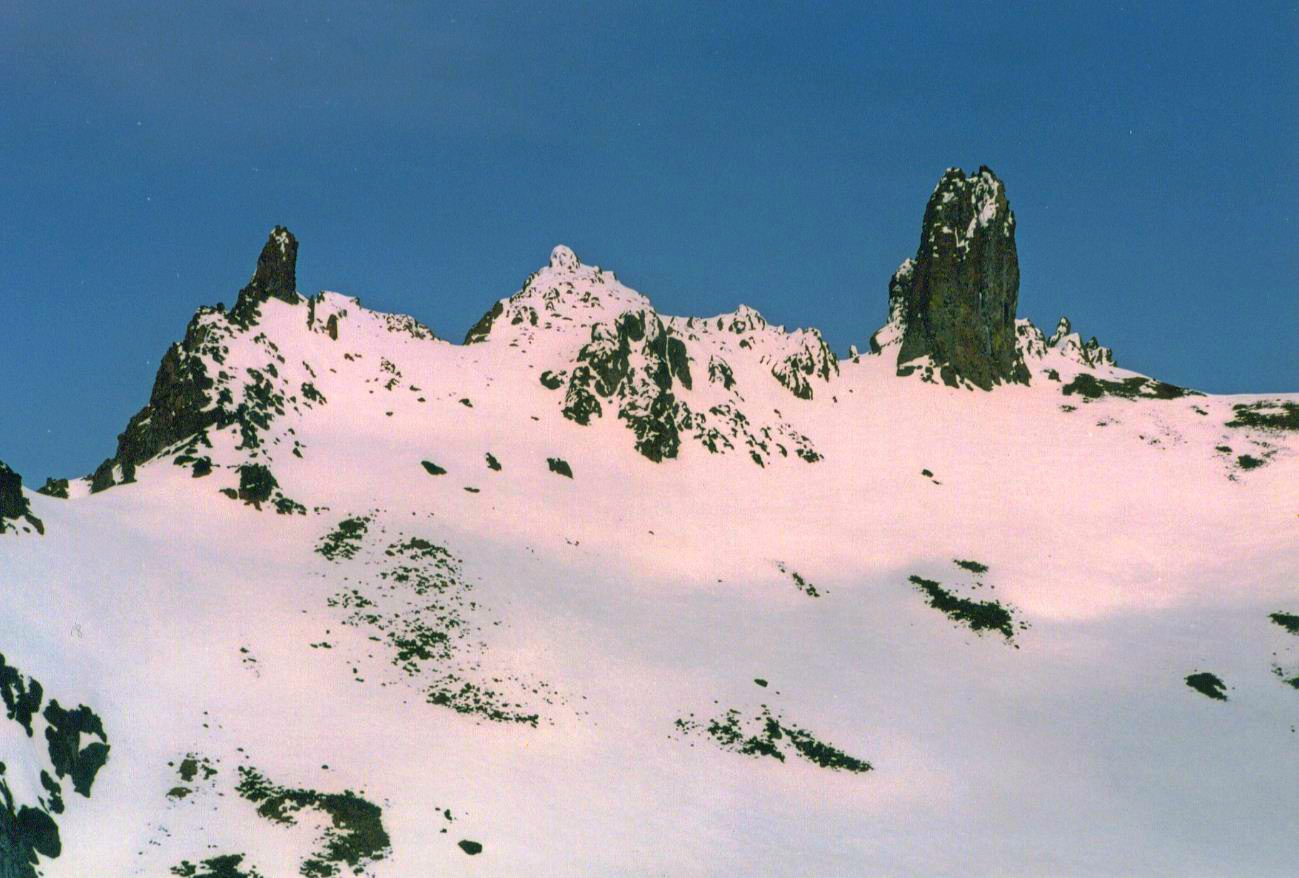
Gilhooley Tower to right
