= Sweat Spire =

Mountain in Washington (state), United States

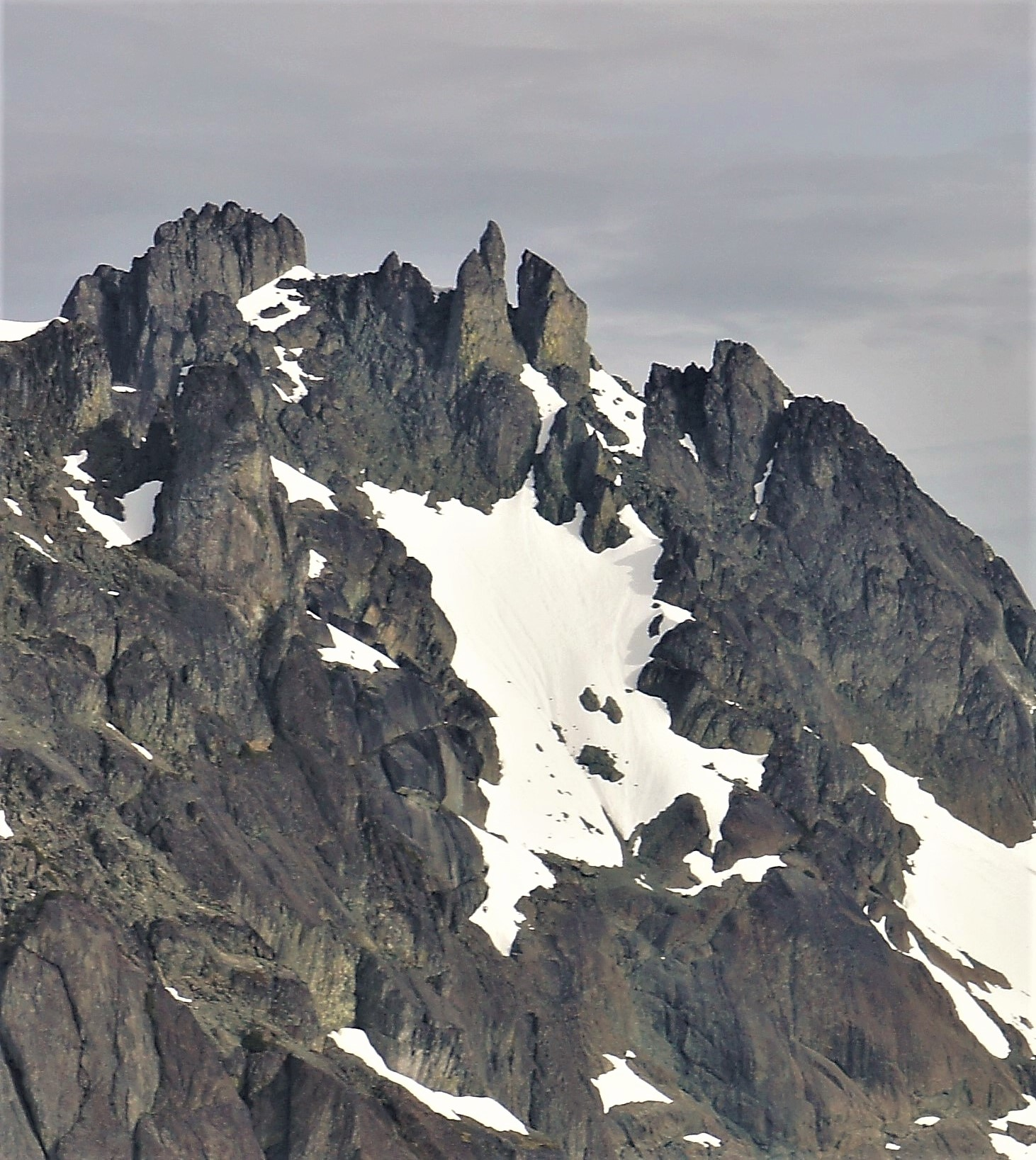
- Sweat Spire centered (Mt. Johnson's summit upper left)

Highest point
- Elevation: 7,580 ft (2,310 m)
- Parent peak: Mount Johnson (7,680 ft)
- Isolation: 0.05 mi (0.080 km)
- Coordinates: 47°50′00″N 123°14′11″W

Geography
- Location within Washington (state) Location within the United States
- Country: United States
- State: Washington
- County: Jefferson
- Protected area: Olympic National Park
- Parent range: Olympic Mountains
- Topo map: USGS Mount Deception

Geology
- Rock age: Eocene

Climbing
- First ascent: 1962
- Easiest route: class 5.2 via SW aspect

Sweat Spire is a 7,580-foot-elevation (2,310-meter) summit located in the Olympic Mountains, in Jefferson County of Washington state. It is situated within Olympic National Park, and is set within the Daniel J. Evans Wilderness. It is part of The Needles range, which is a subset of the Olympic range. The nearest higher peak is Mount Johnson, 0.06 mi (0.097 km) to the southwest, and Gasp Pinnacle (7,520 ft) is to the immediate north. The spire is in the rain shadow of the Olympic Range, resulting in less precipitation than Mount Olympus and the western Olympics receive. Precipitation runoff from the mountain drains east into Royal Creek, and west into Gray Wolf River, which are both within the drainage basin of the Dungeness River. Topographic relief is significant as the east aspect rises over 2,400 feet (730 m) above Royal Basin in approximately one mile. The first ascent of the 200-foot-tall spire was made in 1962 by Hilton Keith, Joel Merkel, Joe Munson, and Jim Parolini. This landform's name has not been officially adopted by the U.S. Board on Geographic Names, so the feature is not labeled on USGS maps.

== Climate ==
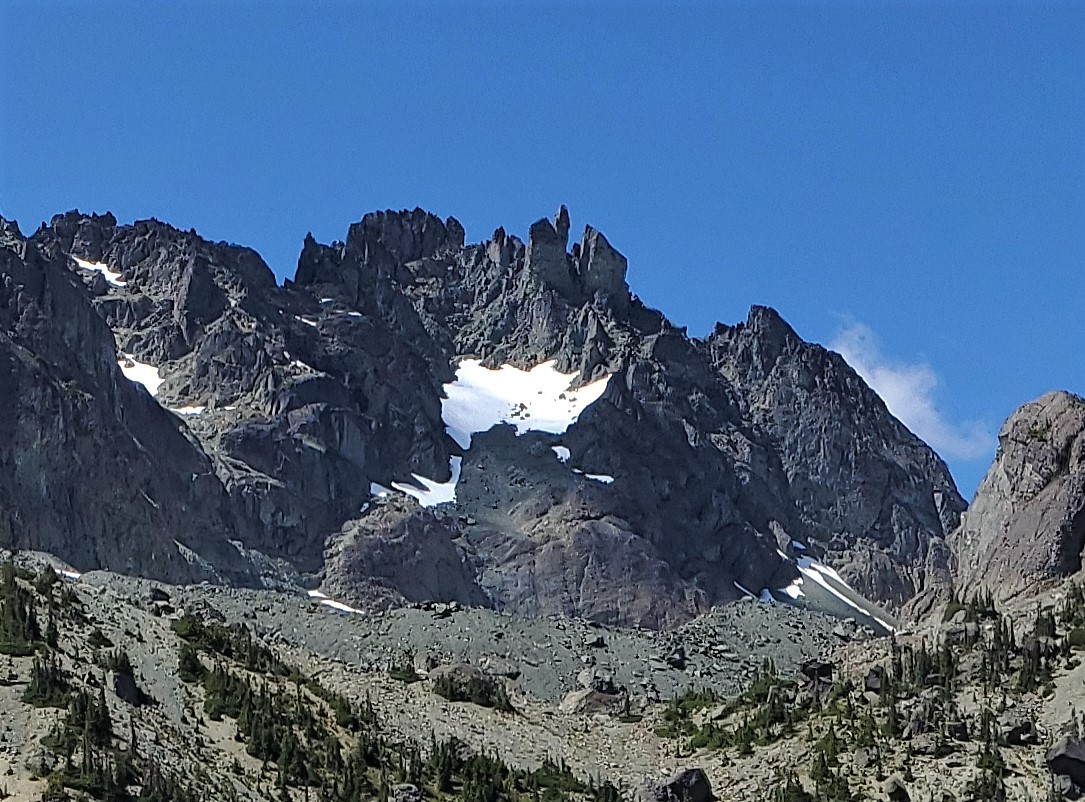
Johnson, Sweat Spire

Sweat Spire is located in the marine west coast climate zone of western North America. Weather fronts originating in the Pacific Ocean travel northeast toward the Olympic Mountains. As fronts approach, they are forced upward by the peaks (orographic lift), causing them to drop their moisture in the form of rain or snow. As a result, the Olympics experience high precipitation, especially during the winter months in the form of snowfall. Because of maritime influence, snow tends to be wet and heavy, resulting in avalanche danger. During winter months weather is usually cloudy, but due to high pressure systems over the Pacific Ocean that intensify during summer months, there is often little or no cloud cover during the summer. The months July through September offer the most favorable weather for climbing Sweat Spire.

== See also ==
- The Needles (Olympic Mountains)
- Geology of the Pacific Northwest
