= Tyler Peak =

Mountain in Washington, USA

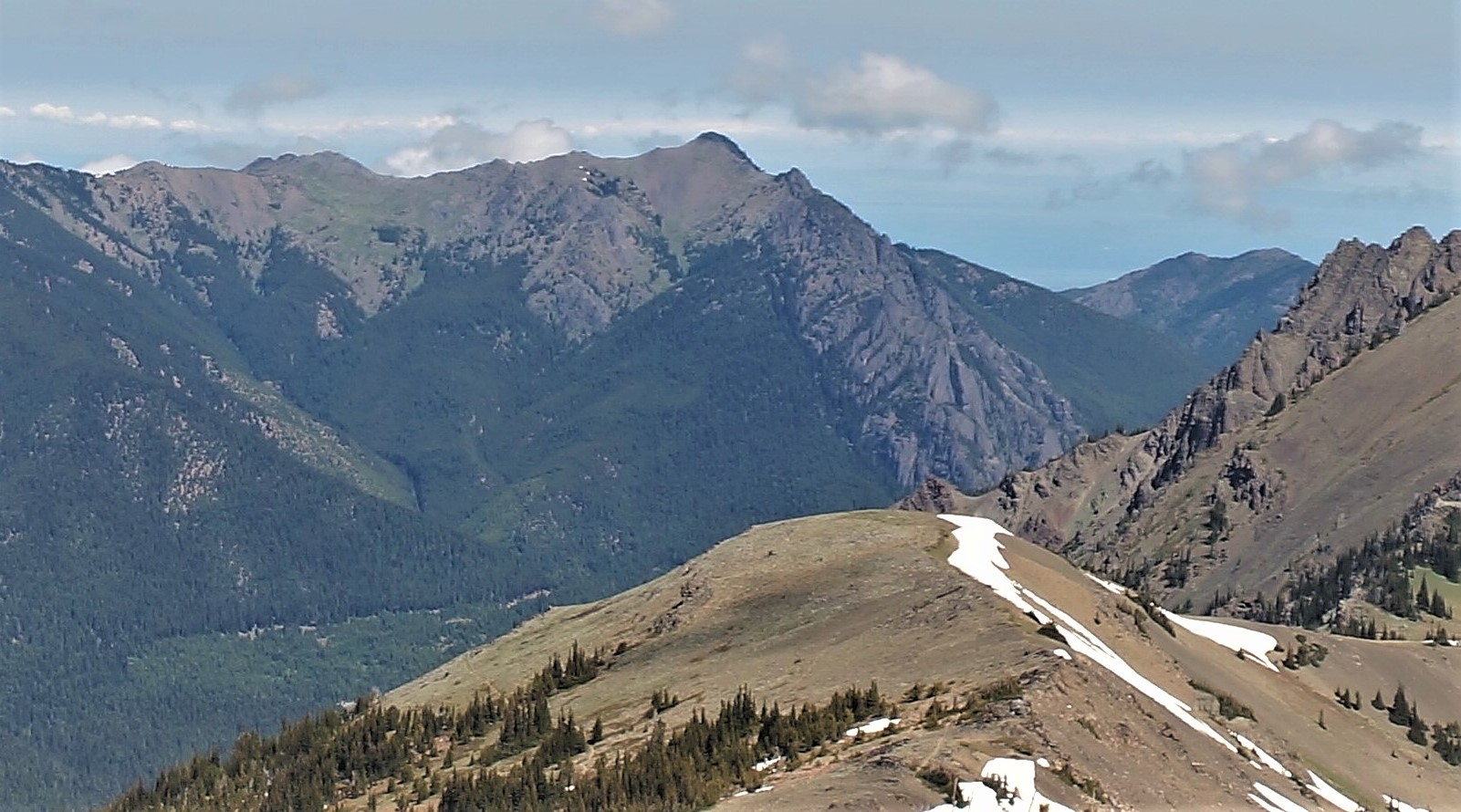
- South aspect

Highest point
- Elevation: 6,364 ft (1,940 m)
- Prominence: 444 ft (135 m)
- Parent peak: Baldy (6,827 ft)
- Isolation: 1.96 mi (3.15 km)
- Coordinates: 47°54′10″N 123°08′54″W

Geography
- Location within Washington (state) Location within the United States
- Country: United States
- State: Washington
- County: Clallam
- Protected area: Buckhorn Wilderness
- Parent range: Olympic Mountains
- Topo map: USGS Tyler Peak

Geology
- Rock age: Eocene
- Rock type: Crescent Formation basalt

Climbing
- Easiest route: class 2 scrambling

Tyler Peak is a 6,364 feet (1,940 m) mountain summit located in Clallam County of Washington state, United States. It is situated in the northeastern Olympic Mountains, near the northern end of Gray Wolf Ridge, and is set within Buckhorn Wilderness, on land managed by the Olympic National Forest. The next highest neighbor is Mt. Baldy, two miles to the west.

Precipitation runoff from Tyler Peak drains into tributaries of the Dungeness River, and topographic relief is significant as the east aspect rises 4,350 feet (1,330 m) above the river in approximately 1.5 miles (2.4 km). Old-growth forests of Douglas fir, western hemlock, and western redcedar grow on the lower slopes surrounding the peak. Like the nearby town of Sequim 12 miles (19 km) to the north, Tyler Peak lies in the rain shadow of the Olympic Mountains. This landform's toponym has been officially adopted by the U.S. Board on Geographic Names.

== Climate ==
Tyler Peak is located in the marine west coast climate zone of western North America. Weather fronts originating in the Pacific Ocean travel northeast toward the Olympic Mountains. As fronts approach, they are forced upward by the peaks (orographic lift), causing them to drop their moisture in the form of rain or snow. As a result, the Olympics experience high precipitation, especially during the winter months in the form of snowfall. Because of maritime influence, snow tends to be wet and heavy, resulting in avalanche danger. During winter months weather is usually cloudy, but due to high pressure systems over the Pacific Ocean that intensify during summer months, there is often little or no cloud cover during the summer. The months July through September offer the most favorable weather for viewing or climbing this peak.

== Climbing routes ==
Established ascent routes on Tyler Peak:

- via the ridge between Baldy and Tyler Peak - class 1
- via the Dungeness River Road at Tyler Creek - class 2

== Gallery ==
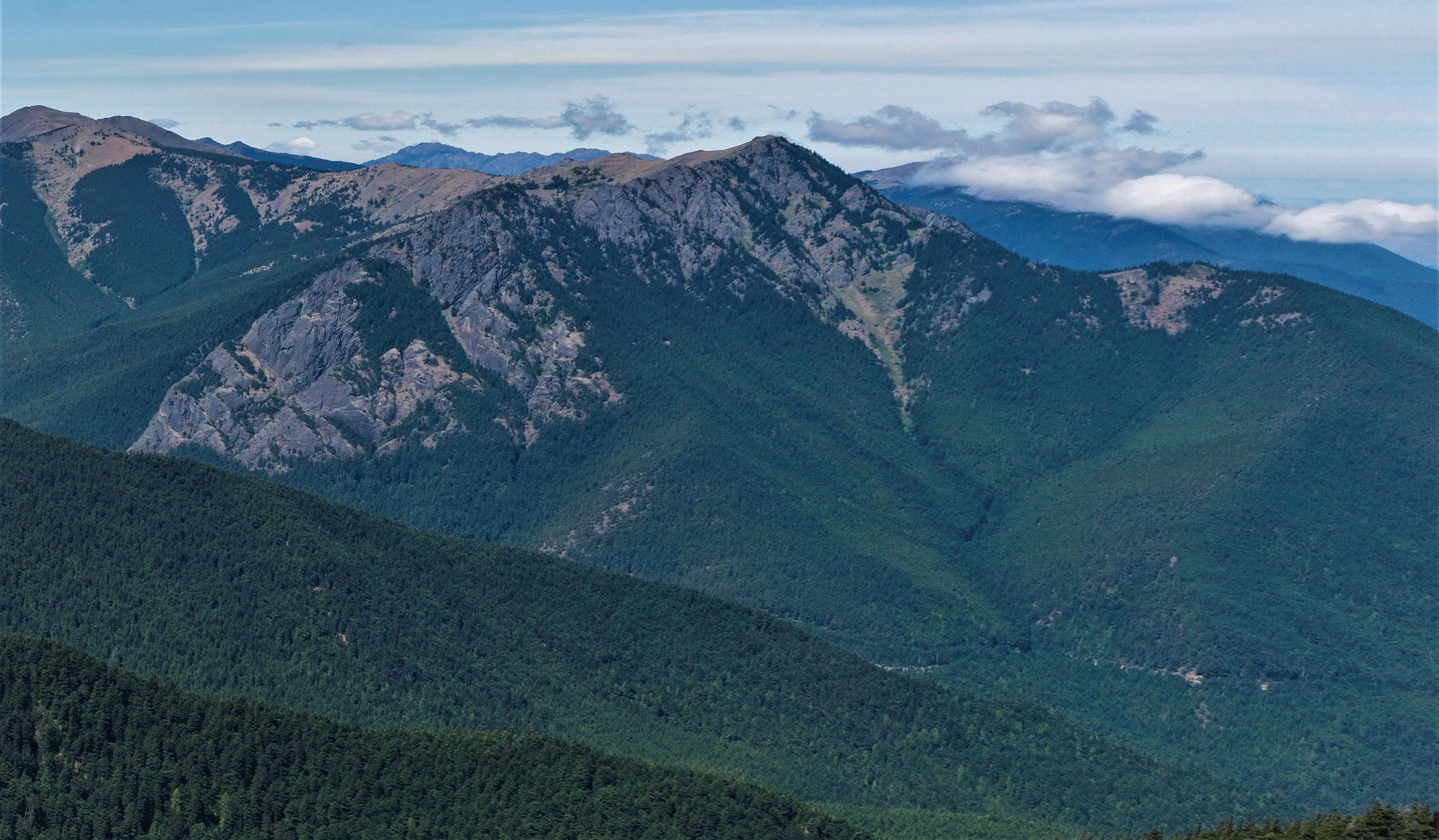
East aspect

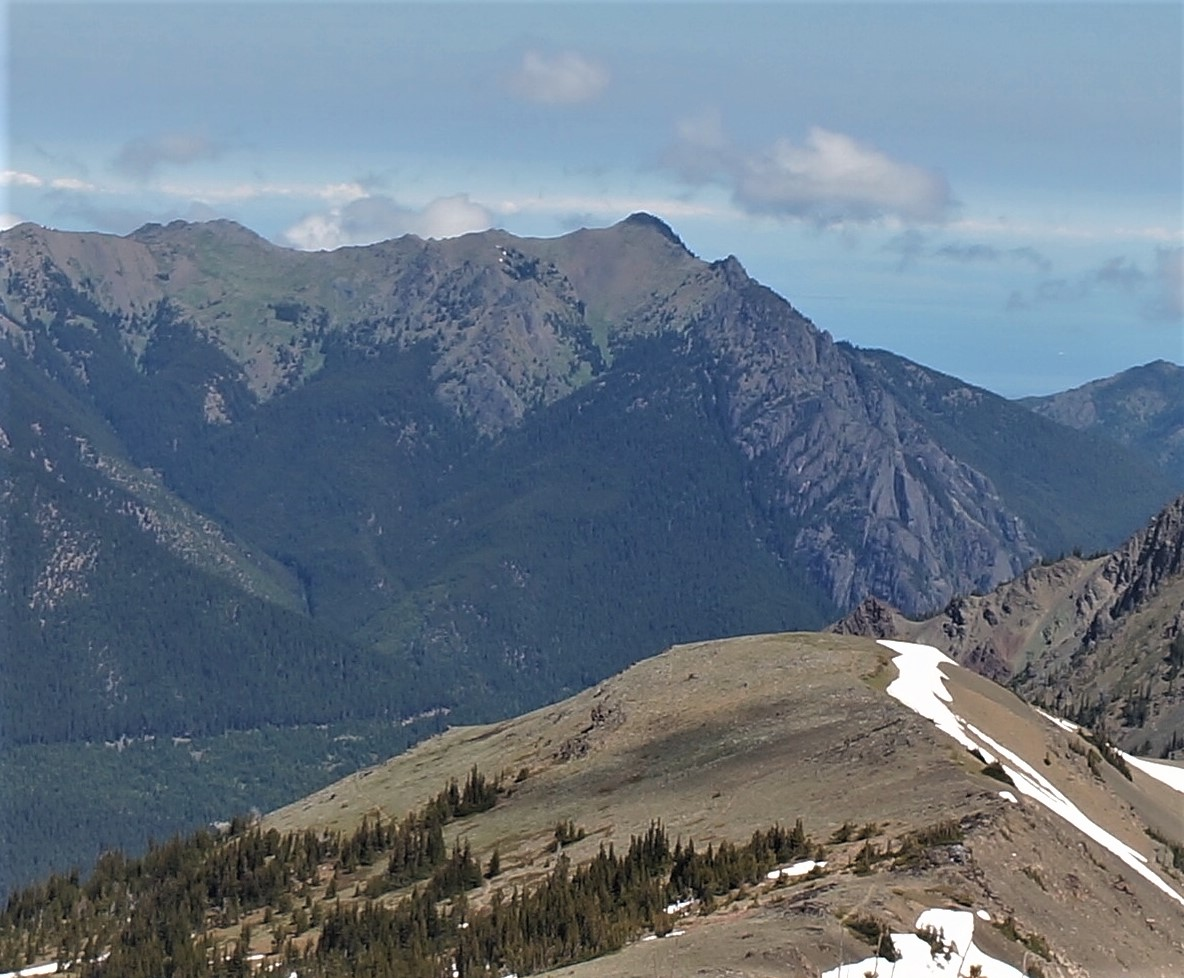
South aspect

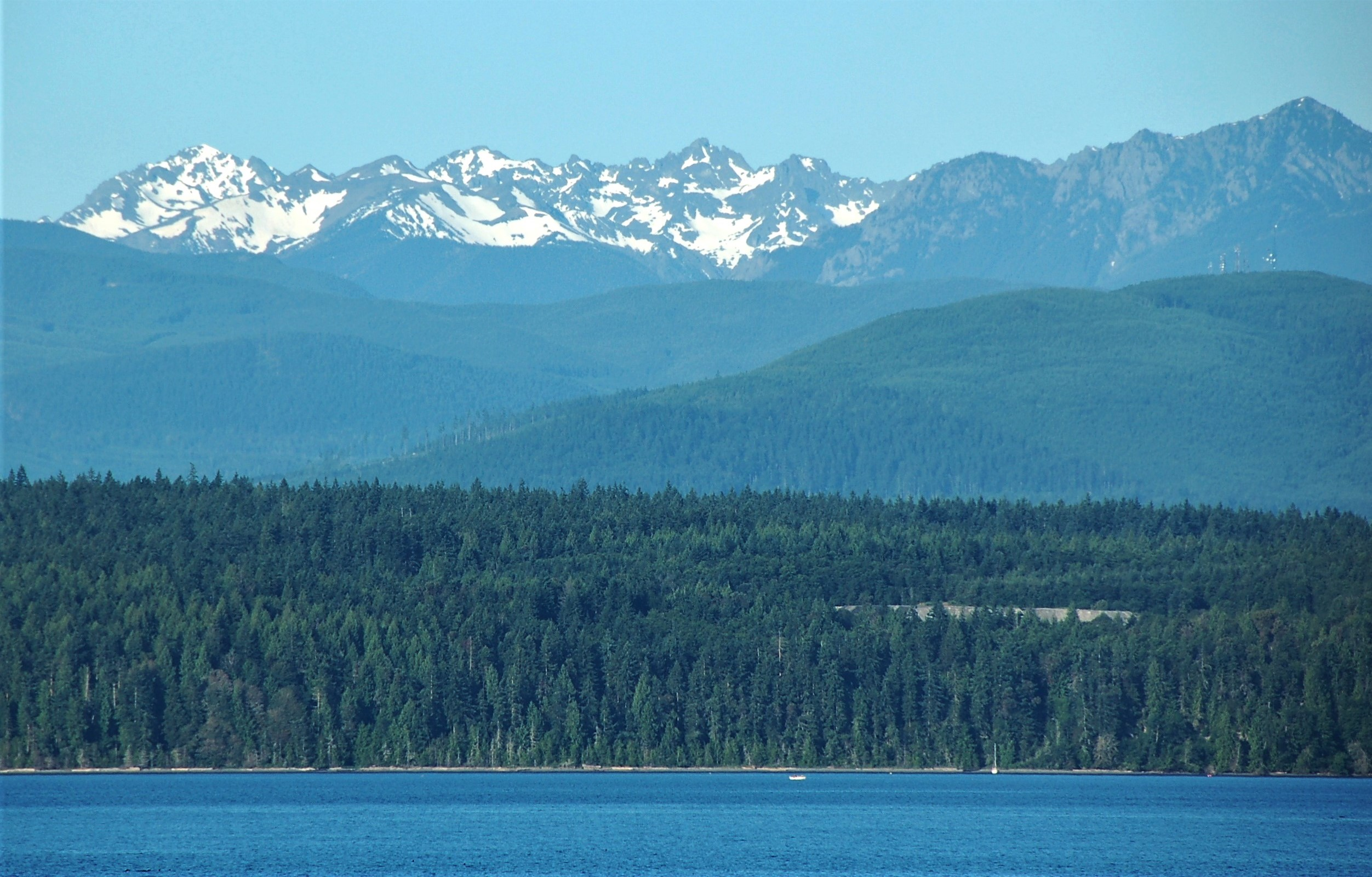
Mt. Deception (left), The Needles centered, Tyler Peak along right edge,
as seen from near Port Townsend

== See also ==
- Geology of the Pacific Northwest
