= Mount Deception (Washington) =

Mountain in Washington (state), United States

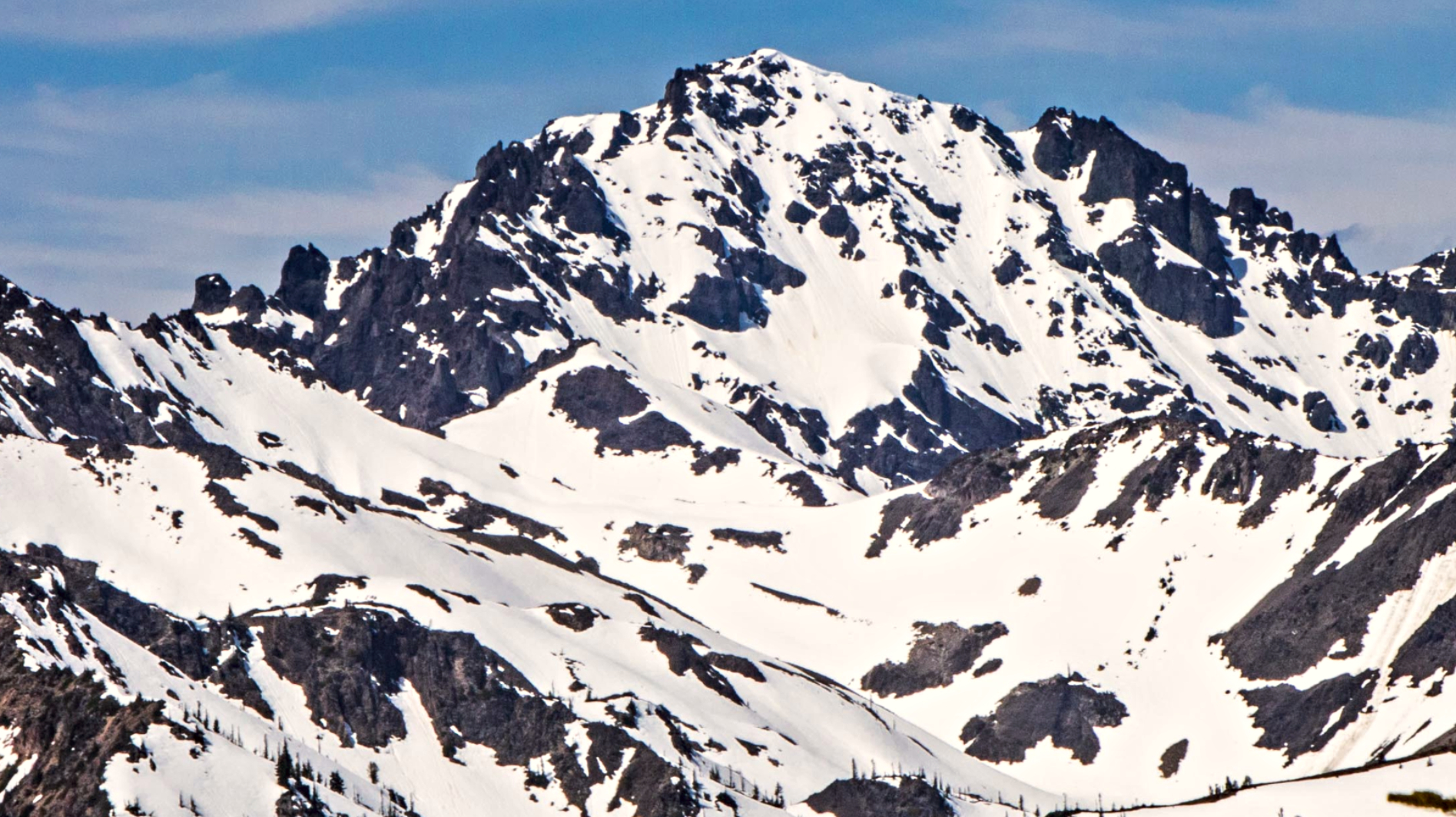
- Mount Deception

Highest point
- Elevation: 7,788 ft (2,374 m)
- Prominence: 4,108 ft (1,252 m)
- Coordinates: 47°48′47″N 123°14′01″W

Geography
- Location within Washington (state)
- Country: United States
- State: Washington
- County: Jefferson
- Protected area: Olympic National Park
- Parent range: Olympic Mountains

Geology
- Rock age: Eocene
- Rock type: Basalt

Climbing
- Easiest route: YDS 2

Mount Deception is a peak in the Olympic Mountains of Cascadia. It is in Olympic National Park on the Olympic Peninsula in the U.S. state of Washington.

== Description ==
At 7,788 feet (2,374 m) high Mount Deception is the second highest peak of the Olympic Mountains, after Mount Olympus. It is the highest peak of the eastern Olympics. Mount Deception's prominence is 4,108 feet (1,252 m), making it the 17th most prominent peak in Washington. Its nearest higher peak is Mount Olympus at 21.79 mi (35.07 km) to the west.

Mount Deception is located in the northeast portion of the Olympics Mountains just northeast of Mount Mystery between Deception Creek and Royal Creek. The region is known as Royal Basin and includes the upper reaches of Royal Creek. Mount Deception lies at the head of Royal Basin. This location puts it in the rain shadow of the Olympics, resulting in far less precipitation than Mount Olympus and the western Olympics receive. Although Mount Deception is the highest peak in the eastern Olympics, it is not visible from Seattle.

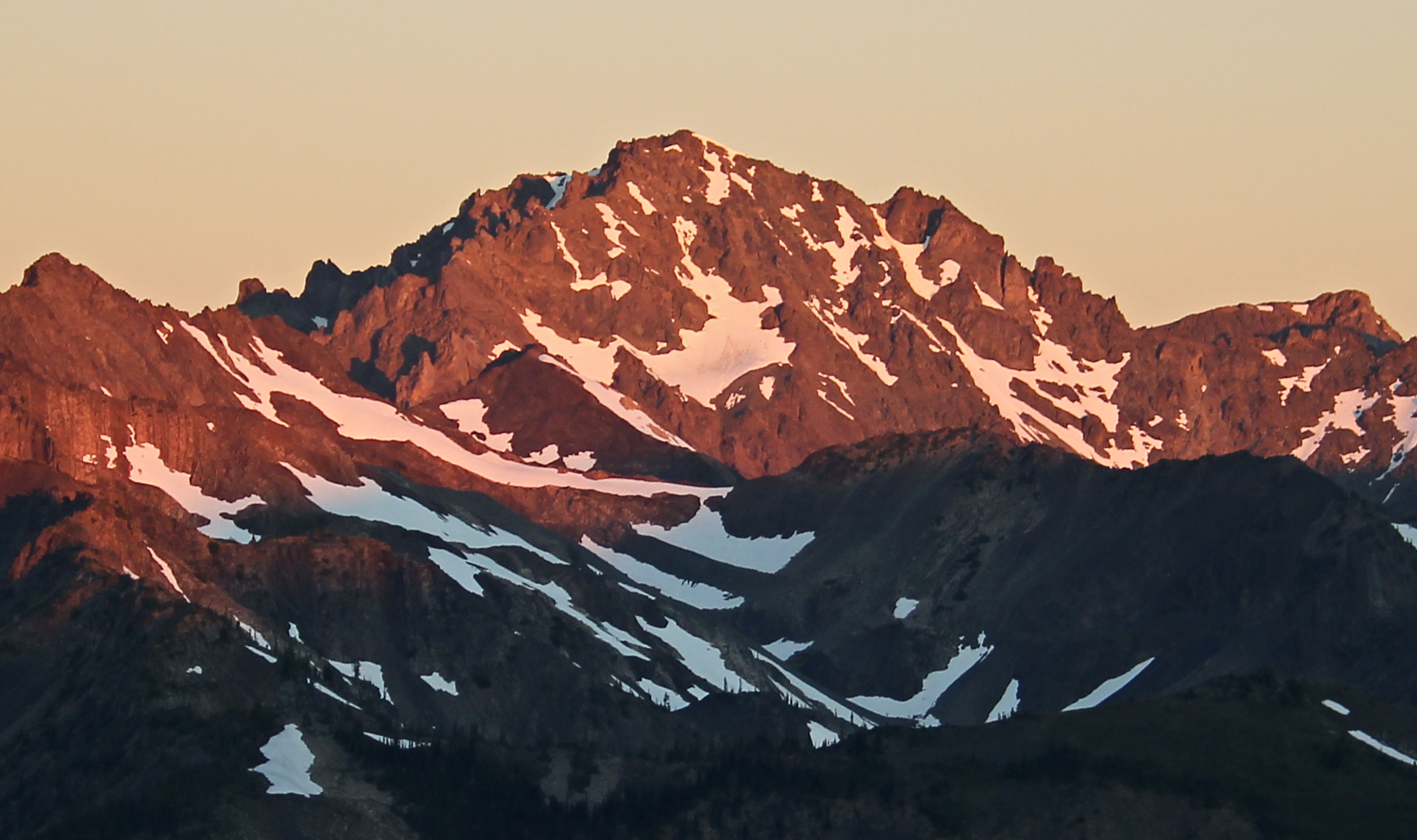
Sunrise on Mount Deception as seen from Marmot Pass

Radiating northward from the shoulders of Mount Deception are Gilhooley Tower, The Needles, Mount Clark (7,528 ft or 2,295 m), Mount Walkinshaw (7,378 ft or 2,249 m), and the northeasterly running spur known as Gray Wolf Ridge. To the east and south are Mount Fricaba, Hal Foss Peak, Mount Mystery, and Little Mystery. Two small glaciers hug the mountain's north-facing basalt slopes.

Mount Deception sits on the boundary between the drainage basins of the Dungeness River, to the north, and the Dosewallips River, to the south and east. Deception Creek, a tributary of the Dosewallips River, drains the southern slope of Mount Deception. Gray Wolf Pass is located about 1 mile (1.6 km) west of Mount Deception. The pass connects the Dungeness and Dosewallips drainage basins.

== History ==
Mount Deception had been given the name Mount Holmes by the Seattle Press Expedition in honor of John H. Holmes of the Boston Herald. Later, G.A. Whitehead of the U.S. Forest Service renamed it Mount Deception due to the difficulty mountaineers had in locating climbing routes on the often cloud-covered peak.

== Recreation ==
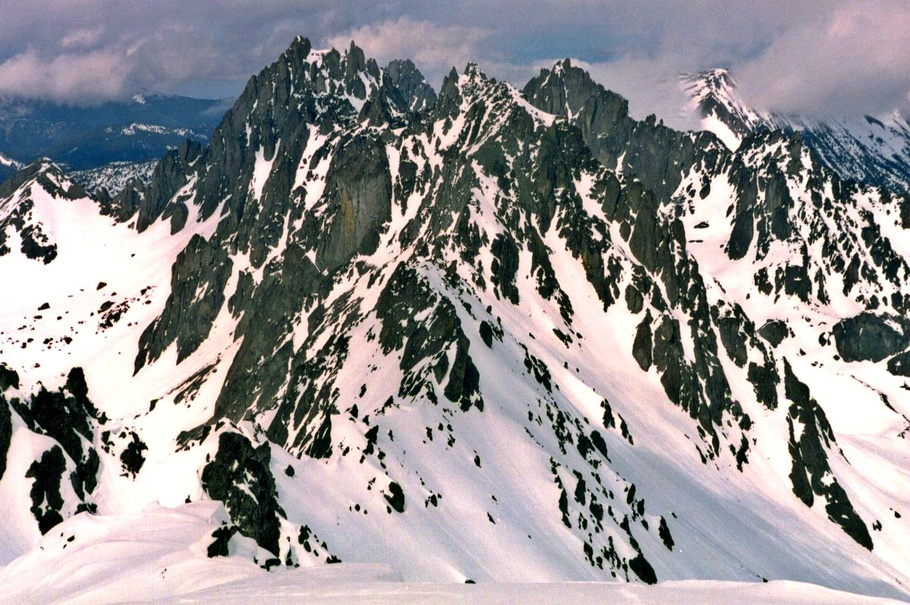
The Needles from Mt. Deception. Martin Peak centered

Unlike the peaks of Gray Wolf Ridge, which are scalable for fit and determined day hikers, mountaineering skills are necessary for Mount Deception itself. While not a particularly technical climb, it is steep and exposed. If a climber falls and does not arrest immediately, loose rock and rotten snow may make it difficult to stop falling for some distance. Fatalities have occurred on Mount Deception and the National Park Service recommends climbers be experienced in self-arrest skills, rock climbing, and route-finding.

The adjacent Needles are typically regarded as providing better, and somewhat more difficult, mountaineering objectives in the Royal Basin area.

== Climate ==
Based on the Köppen climate classification, Mount Deception is located in the marine west coast climate zone of western North America. Most weather fronts originate in the Pacific Ocean, and travel northeast toward the Olympic Mountains. As fronts approach, they are forced upward by the peaks of the Olympic Range, causing them to drop their moisture in the form of rain or snowfall (Orographic lift). As a result, the Olympics experience high precipitation, especially during the winter months. During winter months, weather is usually cloudy, but, due to high pressure systems over the Pacific Ocean that intensify during summer months, there is often little or no cloud cover during the summer. In terms of favorable weather, the best months for climbing are June through September.

Climate data for Mount Deception 47.8242 N, 123.2360 W, Elevation: 6,969 ft (2,124 m) (1991–2020 normals)
Month	Jan	Feb	Mar	Apr	May	Jun	Jul	Aug	Sep	Oct	Nov	Dec	Year
Mean daily maximum °F (°C)	28.1 (−2.2)	28.4 (−2.0)	30.7 (−0.7)	35.3 (1.8)	42.5 (5.8)	47.6 (8.7)	56.2 (13.4)	57.1 (13.9)	52.0 (11.1)	41.0 (5.0)	31.2 (−0.4)	26.7 (−2.9)	39.7 (4.3)
Daily mean °F (°C)	23.3 (−4.8)	22.5 (−5.3)	23.6 (−4.7)	27.3 (−2.6)	34.2 (1.2)	39.2 (4.0)	46.9 (8.3)	47.8 (8.8)	43.4 (6.3)	34.3 (1.3)	26.2 (−3.2)	22.2 (−5.4)	32.6 (0.3)
Mean daily minimum °F (°C)	18.5 (−7.5)	16.7 (−8.5)	16.5 (−8.6)	19.3 (−7.1)	25.8 (−3.4)	30.8 (−0.7)	37.6 (3.1)	38.5 (3.6)	34.7 (1.5)	27.6 (−2.4)	21.1 (−6.1)	17.7 (−7.9)	25.4 (−3.7)
Average precipitation inches (mm)	13.64 (346)	9.69 (246)	10.31 (262)	6.67 (169)	3.94 (100)	2.99 (76)	1.52 (39)	1.76 (45)	2.96 (75)	8.30 (211)	13.60 (345)	15.68 (398)	91.06 (2,312)
Source: PRISM Climate Group

== Geology ==
The Olympic Mountains are composed of obducted clastic wedge material and oceanic crust, primarily Eocene sandstone, turbidite, and basaltic oceanic crust. The mountains were sculpted during the Pleistocene era by erosion caused by glaciers advancing and retreating multiple times.

== See also ==
- Olympic Mountains
- Geology of the Pacific Northwest
- Geography of Washington (state)
- List of mountains of the United States
- List of mountains by elevation
