= Gray Wolf Ridge =

Mountain in United States of America

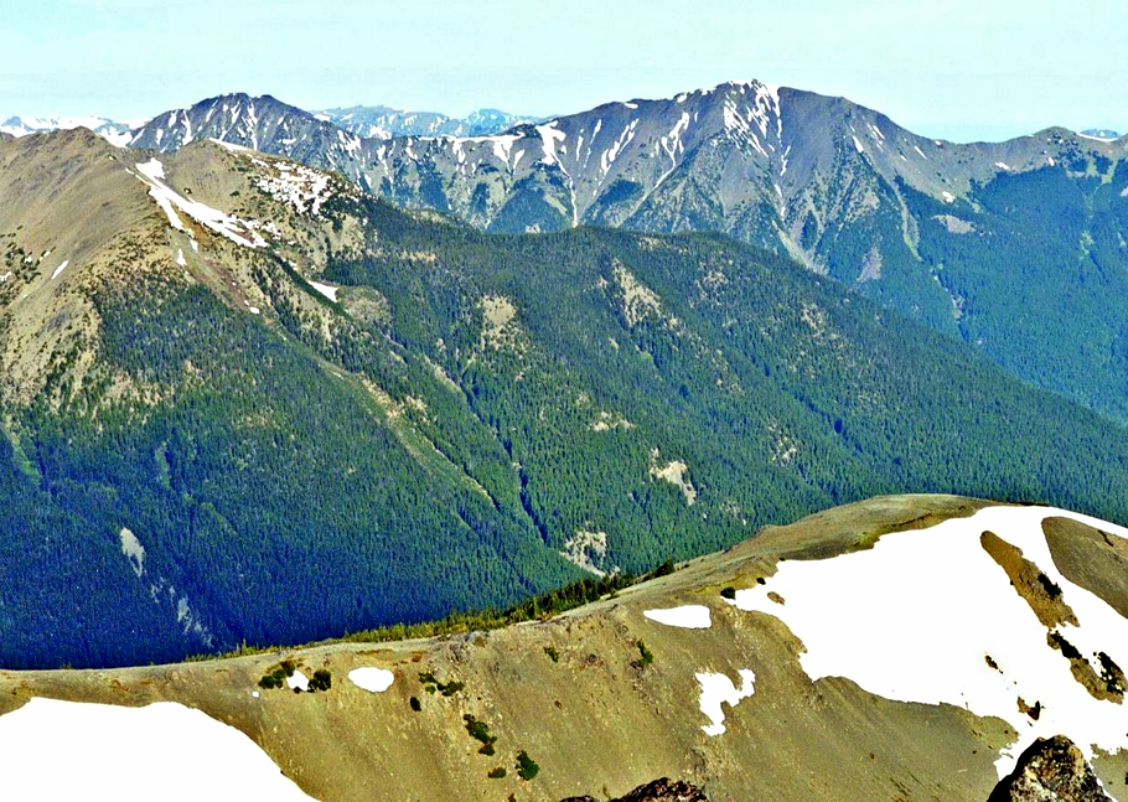
- Gray Wolf Ridge (top) from Buckhorn Mountain

Highest point
- Elevation: 7,218 ft (2,200 m) NGVD 29
- Prominence: 818 ft (249 m)
- Parent peak: Mount Walkinshaw (7,378 ft)
- Isolation: 2.68 mi (4.31 km)
- Coordinates: 47°52′11″N 123°12′51″W

Geography
- Location within Washington (state) Location within the United States
- Location: Clallam County, Washington
- Parent range: Olympic Mountains
- Topo map: USGS Mount Deception

Climbing
- First ascent: 1928
- Easiest route: class 2

Gray Wolf Ridge is a spur of the northeastern Olympic Mountains in Washington's Olympic Peninsula. Arcing northeast from the Mount Deception - Needles - Mount Clark - Mount Walkinshaw massif, Gray Wolf Ridge is covered by alpine and subalpine forests up to the timberline, leaving the upper elevations of the ridge's six rocky peaks vegetated only by fragile alpine meadows. The ridge and its component mountains are markedly steep, as is its primary access route, the Maynard Burn Trail (#816) of Olympic National Forest. The higher, western segment of Gray Wolf Ridge lies within the boundary of Olympic National Park.

Gray Wolf Mountain, at 7,218 feet (2,200 m) above sea level, is the ridge's highest summit. It was first climbed by Leigh B. Lint in 1928. Other distinct peaks include '7076' (7076), Baldy (6797), Tyler Peak (6364), and Maynard Peak (5065), which forms the northeastern terminus of Gray Wolf Ridge. Gray Wolf River runs through the valley-bottom to the Ridge's north; Royal Creek and the Dungeness River flow through the valley along the Ridge's east and south. Gray Wolf Ridge is the highest point of Clallam County.

== Climate ==
Gray Wolf Ridge is located in the marine west coast climate zone of western North America. Most weather fronts originate in the Pacific Ocean, and travel northeast toward the Olympic Mountains. As fronts approach, they are forced upward by the peaks of the Olympic Range, causing them to drop their moisture in the form of rain or snowfall (Orographic lift). As a result, the Olympics experience high precipitation, especially during the winter months in the form of snowfall. During winter months, weather is usually cloudy, but, due to high pressure systems over the Pacific Ocean that intensify during summer months, there is often little or no cloud cover during the summer. Because of maritime influence, snow tends to be wet and heavy, resulting in avalanche danger.

== Geology ==
The Olympic Mountains are composed of obducted clastic wedge material and oceanic crust, primarily Eocene sandstone, turbidite, and basaltic oceanic crust. The mountains were sculpted during the Pleistocene era by erosion and glaciers advancing and retreating multiple times.

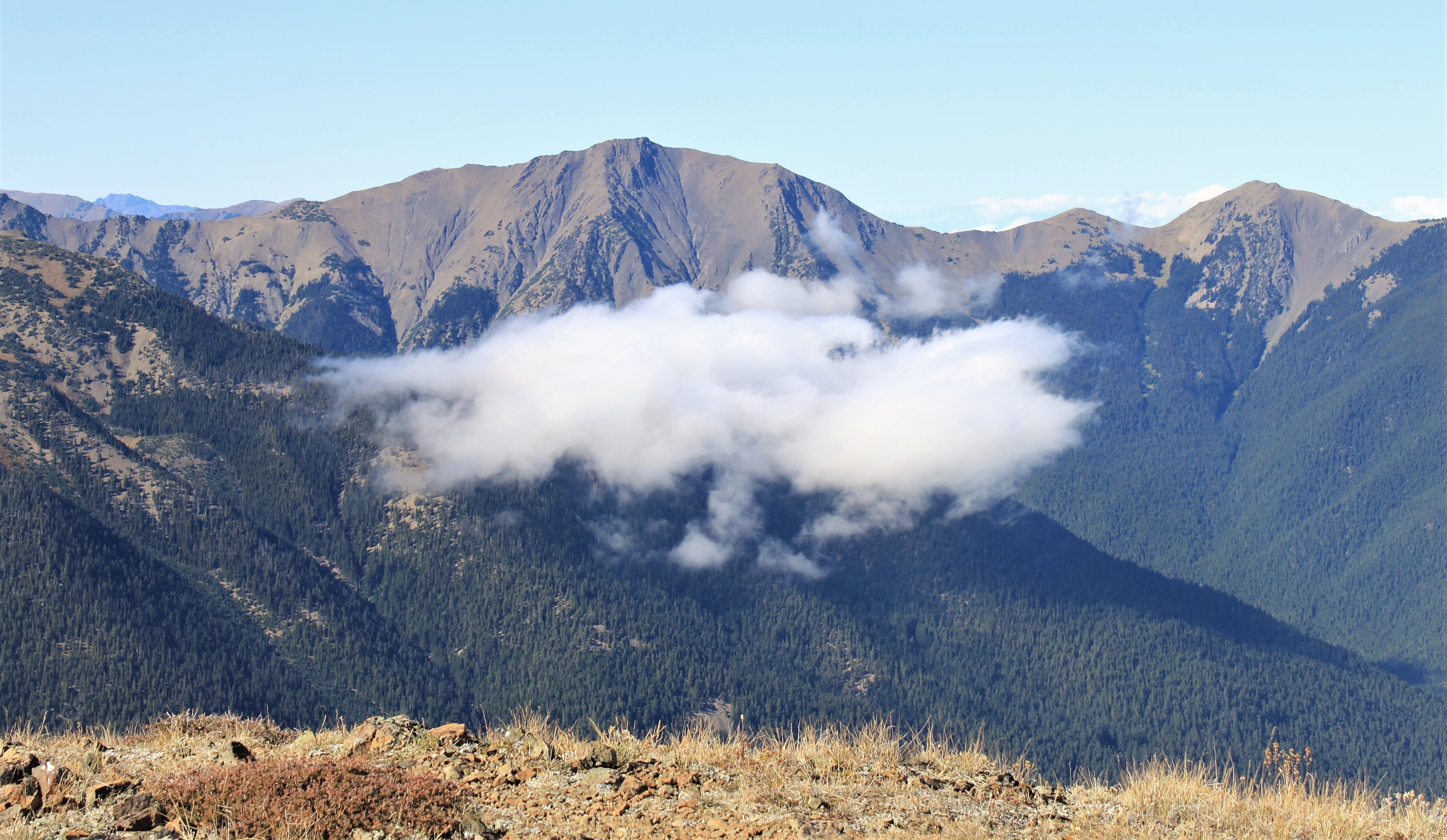
Gray Wolf Ridge from the southeast; Baldy to right

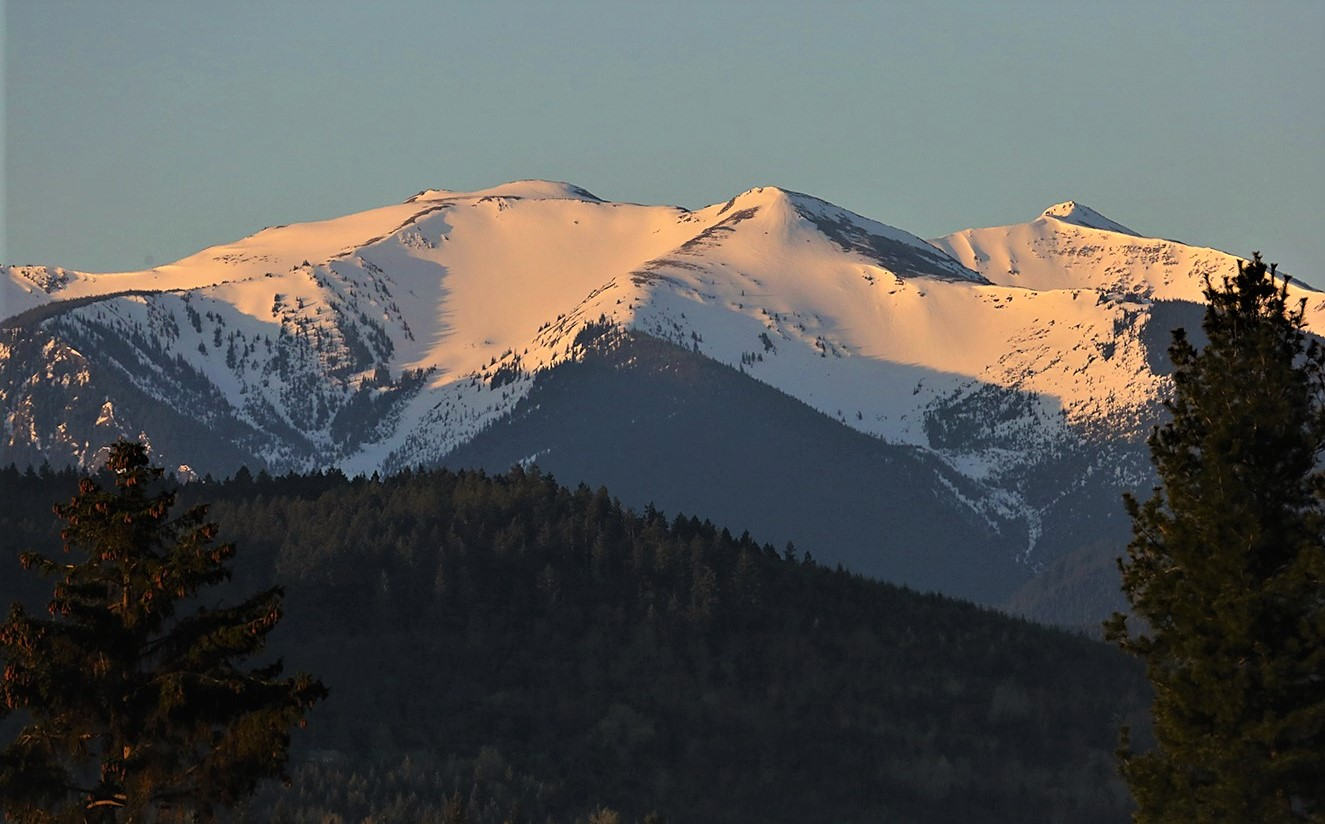
Baldy from Sequim, Washington
