= Mount Johnson (Washington) =

Mountain in Washington (state), United States

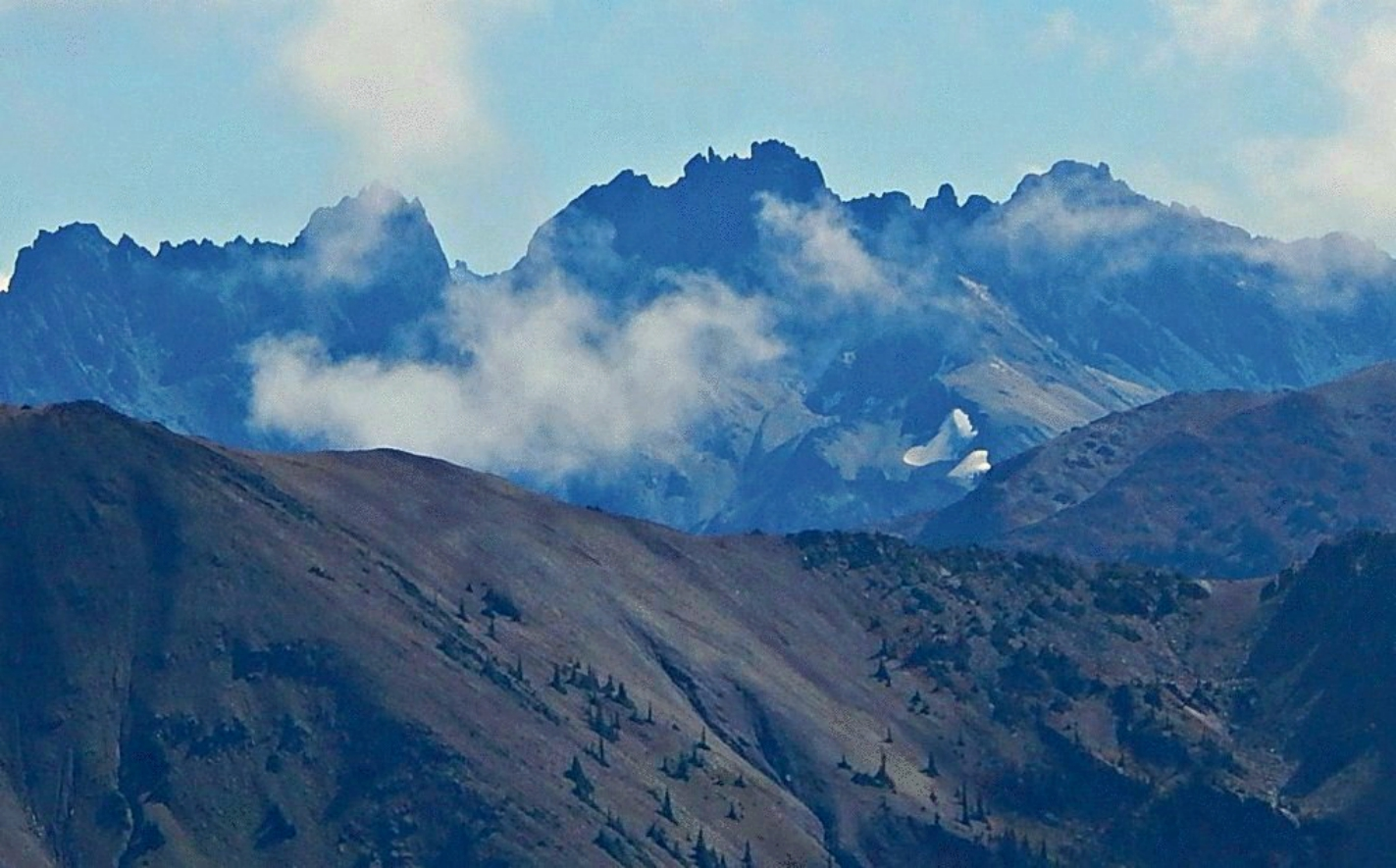
- Mount Johnson (highest point) from northwest

Highest point
- Elevation: 7,680 ft (2,341 m)
- Prominence: 480 ft (146 m)
- Parent peak: Mount Deception
- Isolation: 1.34 mi (2.16 km)
- Coordinates: 47°49′58″N 123°14′14″W

Geography
- Location within Washington (state) Location within the United States
- Country: United States
- State: Washington
- County: Jefferson
- Protected area: Olympic National Park
- Parent range: Olympic Mountains
- Topo map: USGS Mount Deception

Geology
- Rock age: Eocene

Climbing
- First ascent: 1935 or 1940
- Easiest route: class 4 Scramble

Mount Johnson is a summit in the Olympic Mountains and is located in Jefferson County of Washington state. It is situated within Olympic National Park and the Daniel J. Evans Wilderness. At 7,680 feet (2,341 m) high, Mount Johnson is the fourth-highest peak of the Olympic Mountains, after Mount Olympus, Mount Deception, and Mount Constance. It is the highest peak in The Needles range which is a subset of the Olympic range. The nearest higher neighbor is Mount Deception, 1.34 mi (2.16 km) to the south. Mount Johnson is set in the eastern portion of the Olympic Mountains within the drainage basin of the Dungeness River. This location puts it in the rain shadow of the Olympic Range, resulting in less precipitation than Mount Olympus and the western Olympics receive.

== History ==
Mount Johnson was given its name based on what was believed to be the first ascent by Elvin Johnson and George Martin in 1940. However, new evidence has become available establishing that it was climbed by Scott Osborn, Joe Halwax, and John King circa 1935.

== Climate ==
Mount Johnson is located in the marine west coast climate zone of western North America. Weather fronts originating in the Pacific Ocean travel northeast toward the Olympic Mountains. As fronts approach, they are forced upward by the peaks (orographic lift), causing them to drop their moisture in the form of rain or snow. As a result, the Olympics experience high precipitation, especially during the winter months in the form of snowfall. Because of maritime influence, snow tends to be wet and heavy, resulting in avalanche danger. During winter months weather is usually cloudy, but due to high pressure systems over the Pacific Ocean that intensify during summer months, there is often little or no cloud cover during the summer. The months July through September offer the most favorable weather for viewing or climbing this peak.

== Recreation ==
While not a particularly technical climb, Mount Johnson is a steep and exposed class 4 scramble. It's one of several mountaineering objectives in the Royal Basin area.

== Gallery ==
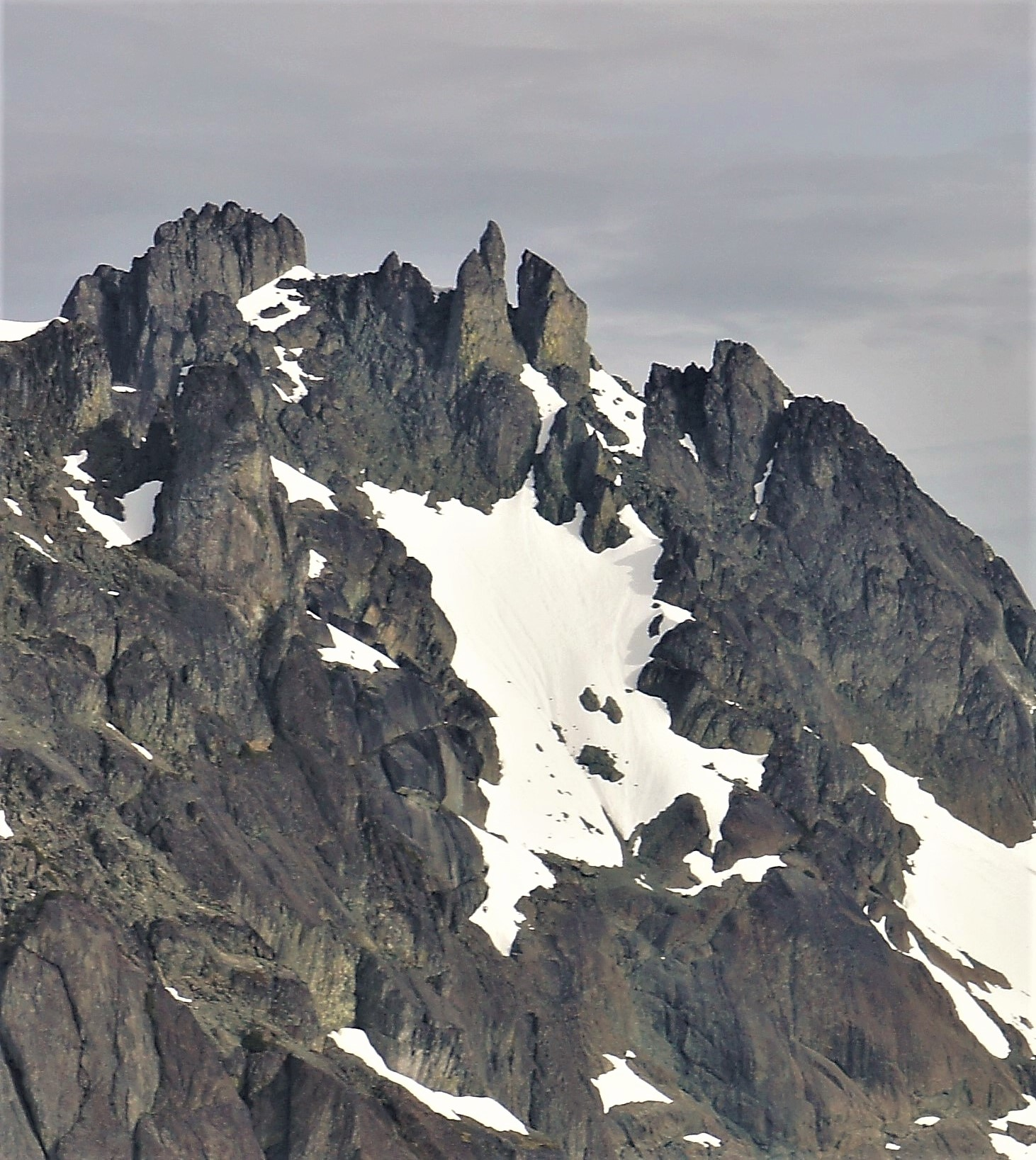
Mt. Johnson summit (upper left), Sweat Spire and Gasp Pinnacle are centered.

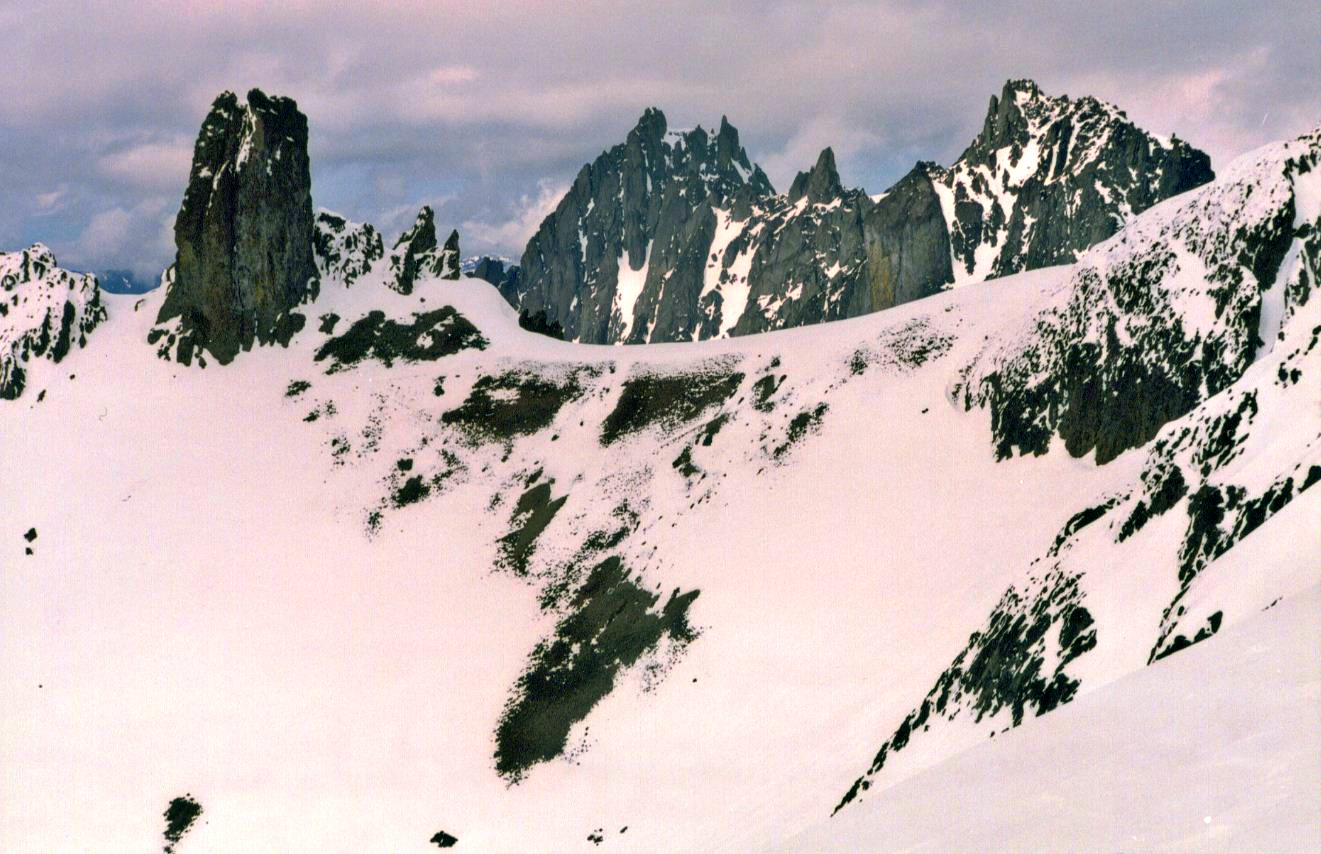
Mount Johnson (center) seen from Mount Deception

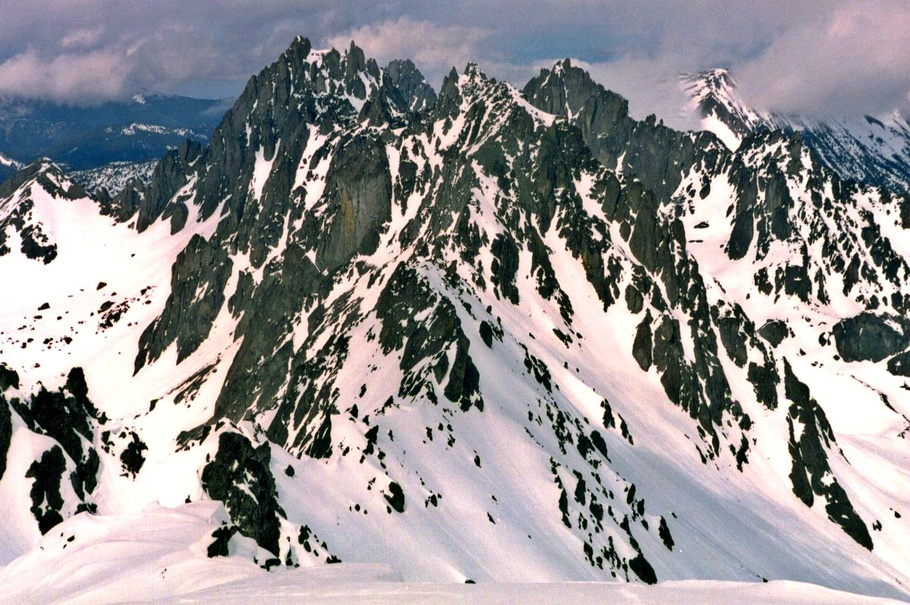
The Needles from Mount Deception. Johnson in upper left behind Martin Peak

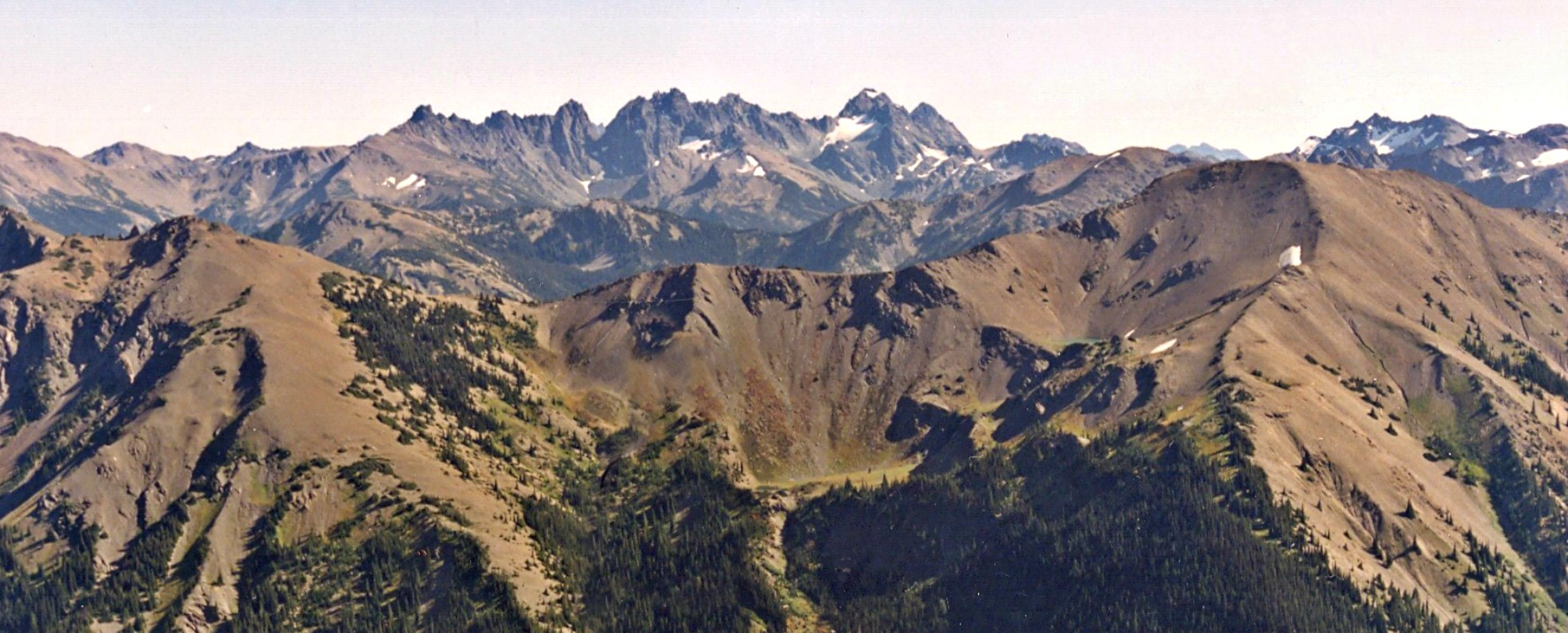
Mount Johnson and The Needles seen from Elk Mountain

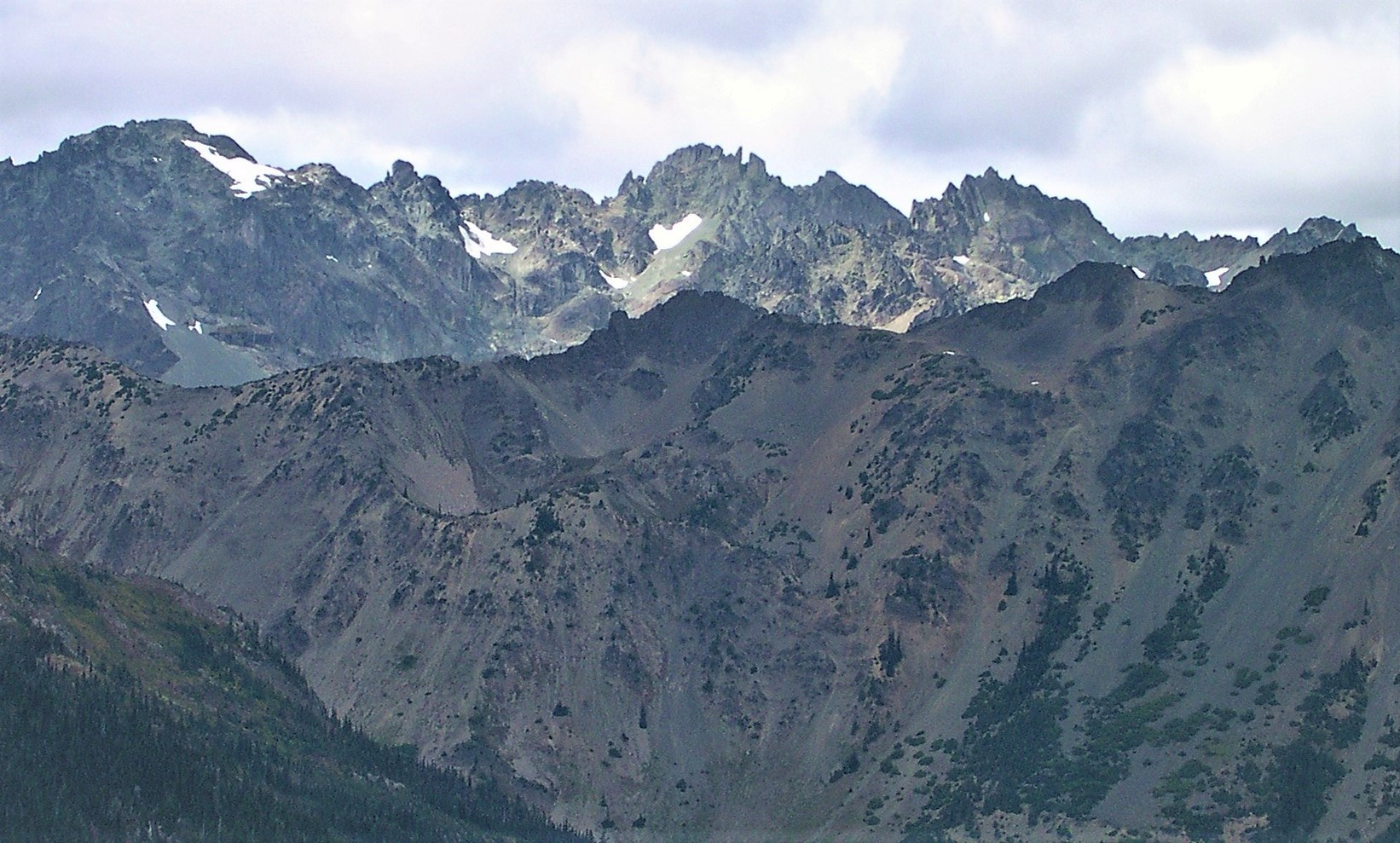
Mount Johnson centered in the distance, as seen from Marmot Pass.
