= Gray Wolf River =

- Location of the mouth of the Gray Wolf River in Washington

Location
- Country: United States
- State: Washington
- County: Clallam, Jefferson

Physical characteristics
- Source: Olympic Mountains
  - coordinates: 47°49′26″N 123°16′10″W
- Mouth: Dungeness River
  - coordinates: 47°58′35″N 123°6′44″W
  - elevation: 830 ft (250 m)

The Gray Wolf River is a river of the Olympic Peninsula in Washington. It is a tributary of the Dungeness River. It heads near Gray Wolf Pass and drains the west slope of The Needles.

== See also ==
- List of rivers of Washington (state)
