= Dungeness River =

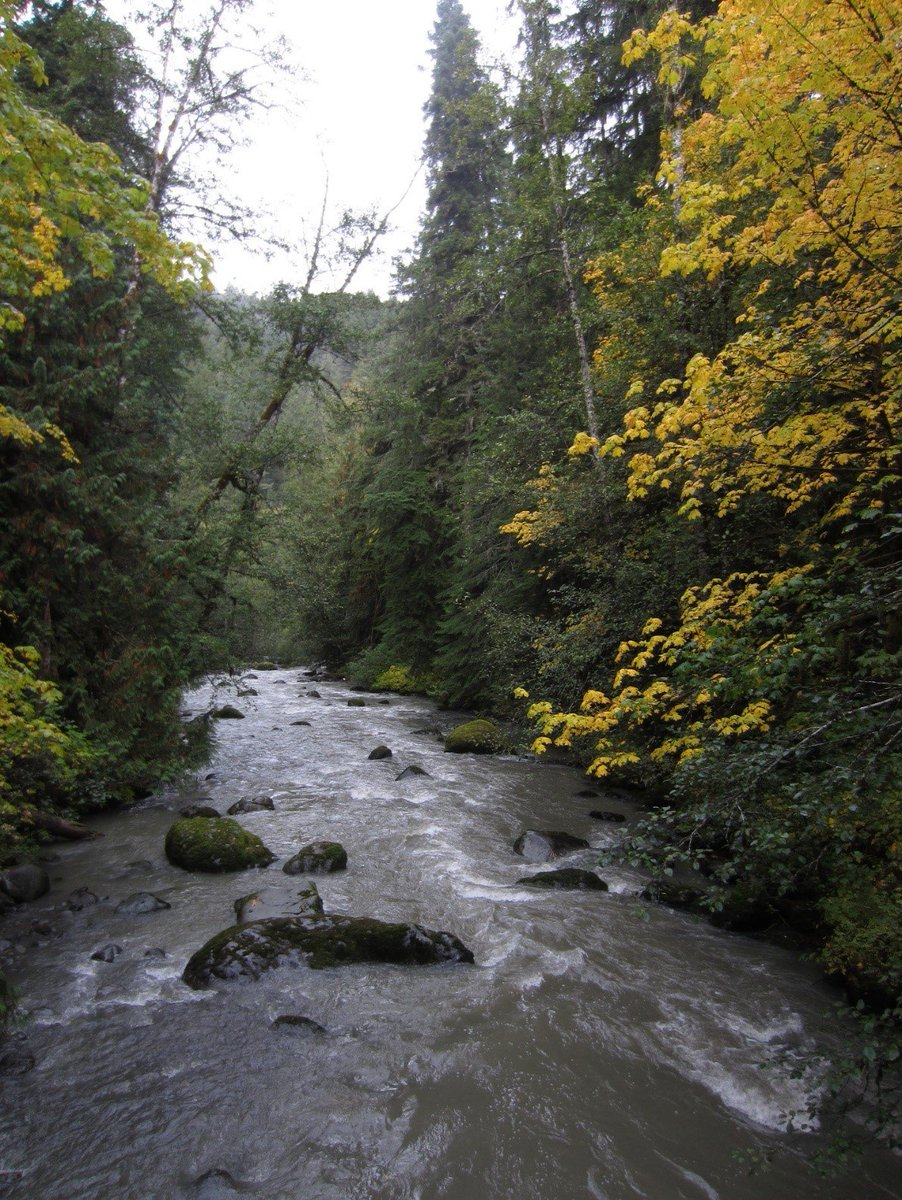

- Location of the mouth of the Dungeness River in Washington

Location
- Country: United States
- State: Washington
- County: Clallam, Jefferson

Physical characteristics
- Source: Olympic Mountains
  - coordinates: 47°48′19″N 123°10′0″W
- Mouth: Strait of Juan de Fuca
  - coordinates: 48°9′3″N 123°8′8″W
- Length: 28 mi (45 km)

The Dungeness River is a 28-mile (45 km) long river located in the Olympic Peninsula in the U.S. state of Washington. It rises near Mount Constance in the Olympic Mountains within the Olympic National Park, flows through the Buckhorn Wilderness, passes by the town of Sequim, and empties into the Strait of Juan de Fuca at Dungeness Bay, behind the Dungeness Spit. One of its main tributaries is the Gray Wolf River. It is crossed by the Dungeness River Bridge.

== History ==
The river was named for Dungeness Spit. The name "Dungeness" refers to the Dungeness headland in England. It was given by George Vancouver in 1792, who wrote: The low sandy point of land, which from its great resemblance to Dungeness in the British Channel, I called New Dungeness.

The Dungeness River, along with the Chehalis River, is part of only two river basins in Washington state that are granted protections and rights under "in-stream flow regulation". Passed in 1976, the law allows the river the right to maintain its own water levels.

== Geography ==
Scarborough Island is a small eyot (river island) in the Dungeness River, in Sequim, Washington. About one acre square, it is located near Dungeness Meadows and can be seen from the Dungeness River Dike.

== See also ==
- List of Washington rivers
- Dungeness crab
