= Lost Peak (Jefferson County, Washington) =

Mountain in Washington (state), United States

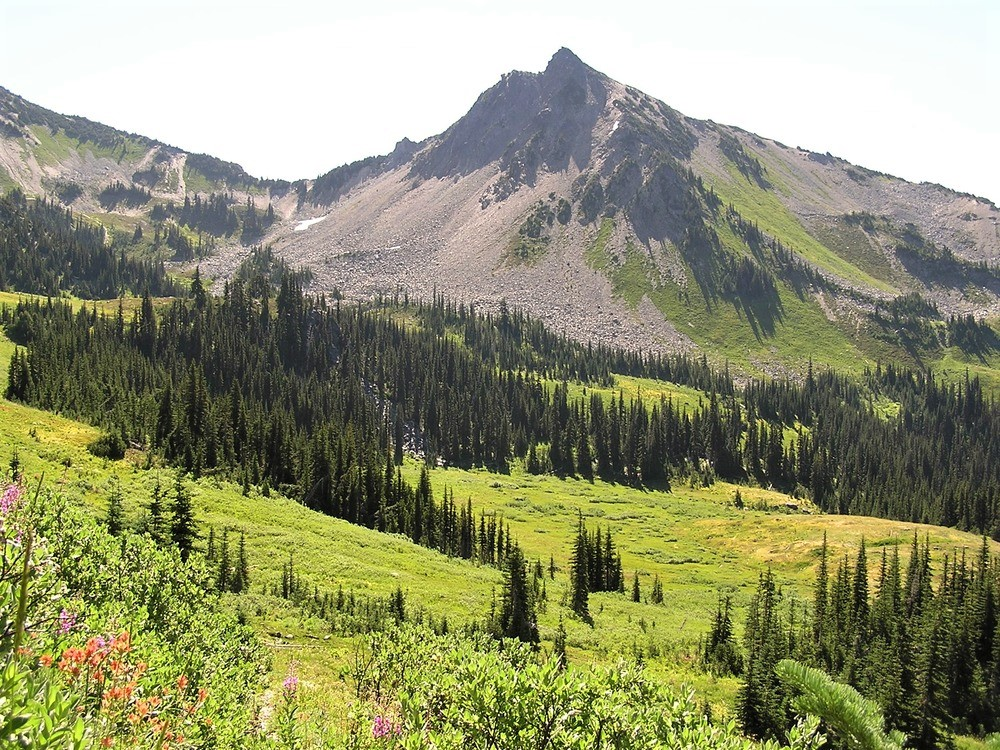
- Northwest aspect

Highest point
- Elevation: 6,515 ft (1,986 m)
- Prominence: 355 ft (108 m)
- Parent peak: Mount Cameron (7,190 ft)
- Isolation: 0.83 mi (1.34 km)
- Coordinates: 47°48′50″N 123°20′13″W

Geography
- Location within Washington (state) Location within the United States
- Country: United States
- State: Washington
- County: Jefferson
- Protected area: Olympic National Park
- Parent range: Olympic Mountains
- Topo map: USGS Wellesley Peak

Geology
- Rock age: Eocene

Climbing
- Easiest route: class 2 via Lost Pass

Lost Peak is a 6,515-foot-elevation (1,986-meter) mountain summit located within Olympic National Park in Jefferson County of Washington state. Part of the Olympic Mountains, Lost Peak is situated immediately northeast of Lost Pass, and is set within the Daniel J. Evans Wilderness. Precipitation runoff from the mountain drains east into the Dosewallips River, and west into the headwaters of the Lost River. Neighbors include line parent Mount Cameron, 0.8 mi (1.3 km) to the north, along with Mount Fromme and Mount Claywood, both 1.8 mi (2.9 km) to the southwest. Topographic relief is significant as the southeast aspect rises 2,500 feet (760 meters) above the Dosewallips River in approximately one mile. This landform's name has been officially adopted by the U.S. Board on Geographic Names. The origin of the "Lost" name is unknown, but a park ranger once described the river area as a "good place to get lost" because of the confusing and difficult travel.

== Climate ==
Based on the Köppen climate classification, Lost Peak is located in the marine west coast climate zone of western North America. Weather fronts originating in the Pacific Ocean travel northeast toward the Olympic Mountains. As fronts approach, they are forced upward by the peaks (orographic lift), causing them to drop their moisture in the form of rain or snow. As a result, the Olympics experience high precipitation, especially during the winter months in the form of snowfall. Because of maritime influence, snow tends to be wet and heavy, resulting in avalanche danger. During winter months weather is usually cloudy, but due to high pressure systems over the Pacific Ocean that intensify during summer months, there is often little or no cloud cover during the summer. The months of June through September offer the most favorable weather for viewing or climbing this mountain.

== Geology ==
The Olympic Mountains are composed of obducted clastic wedge material and oceanic crust, primarily Eocene sandstone, turbidite, and basaltic oceanic crust. The mountains were sculpted during the Pleistocene era by erosion and glaciers advancing and retreating multiple times.

== See also ==
- Geology of the Pacific Northwest
