= Cameron Pass (disambiguation) =

Cameron Pass is a mountain pass on the border of Jackson and Larimer Counties, Colorado, United States

Cameron Pass may also refer to:

- Cameron Pass (Washington), a pass near Mount Cameron, Jefferson County, Washington, United States
- Cameron Pass (Wyoming), a mountain pass in Albany County, Wyoming, United States
- Cameron Pass, a railcar at the Gold Coast Railroad Museum

== See also ==
- List of mountain passes
- Cameron (disambiguation)
- Mount Cameron (disambiguation)
