= Grand Pass =

Grand Pass can refer to any of the following:

- Grand Pass, Missouri, a town in Missouri
- Grand Pass (Washington), a mountain pass in Washington
