= Mount Claywood =

Mountain in Washington (state), United States

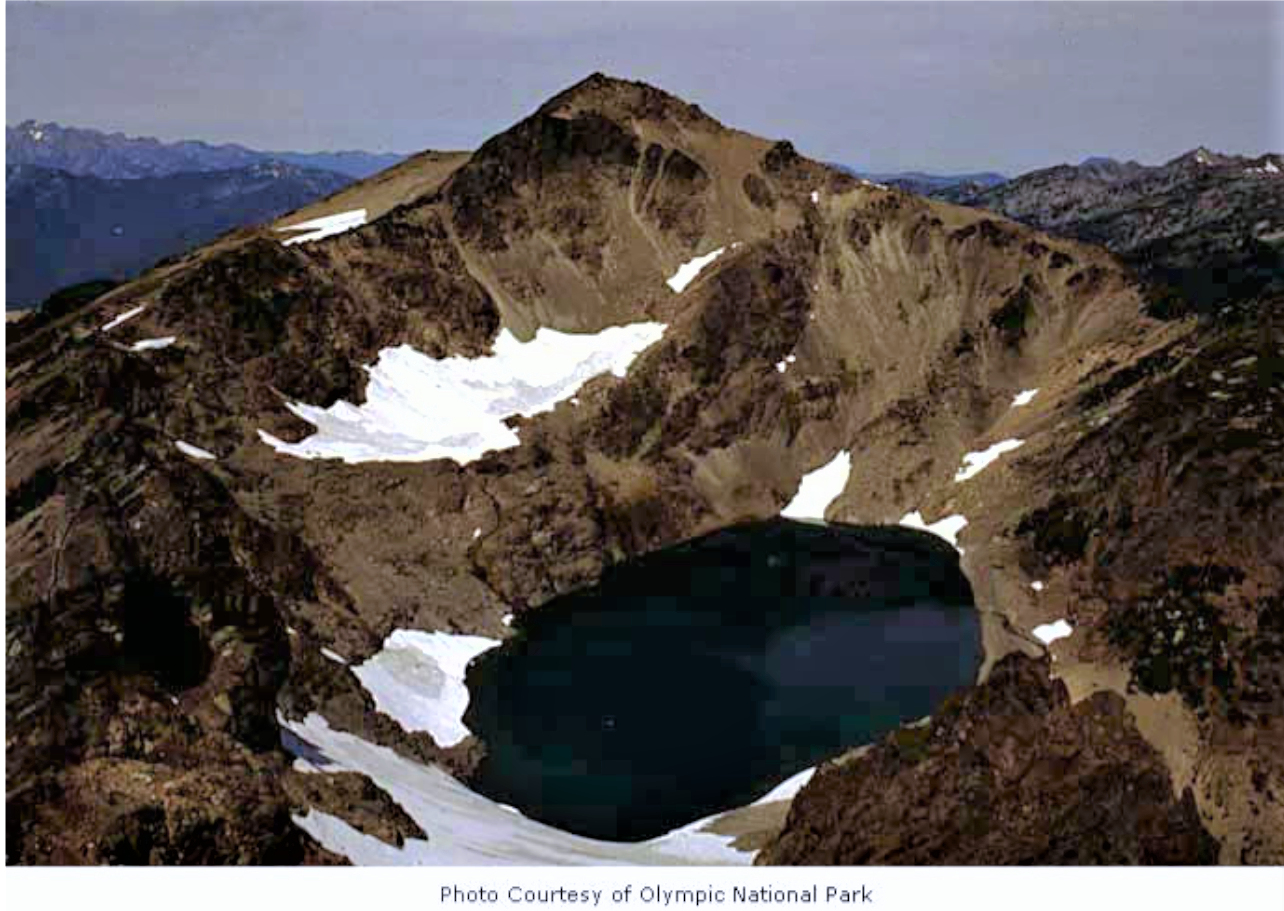
- Southeast aspect, from Mt. Fromme

Highest point
- Elevation: 6,836 ft (2,084 m)
- Prominence: 1,236 ft (377 m)
- Parent peak: Mount Cameron (7,190 ft)
- Isolation: 2.41 mi (3.88 km)
- Coordinates: 47°48′03″N 123°22′13″W

Naming
- Etymology: Henry Clay Wood

Geography
- Location within Washington (state) Location within the United States
- Country: United States
- State: Washington
- County: Jefferson
- Protected area: Olympic National Park
- Parent range: Olympic Mountains
- Topo map: USGS Wellesley Peak

Geology
- Rock age: Eocene

Climbing
- Easiest route: class 2 hiking via Hayden Pass Trail

Mount Claywood is a 6,836-foot (2,084-metre) mountain summit located within Olympic National Park in Jefferson County of Washington state. It is situated at the head of Lost River, and 15 mi (24 km) east of Mount Olympus. Its nearest higher neighbor is Mount Cameron, 2.4 mi (3.9 km) to the northeast. Other nearby peaks include Mt. Fromme, 0.58 mi (0.93 km) to the southeast, and Sentinel Peak, 2 mi (3.2 km) also to the southeast. Precipitation runoff from the mountain drains north and west into tributaries of the Elwha River, and east into Claywood Lake, thence Dosewallips River.

== History ==
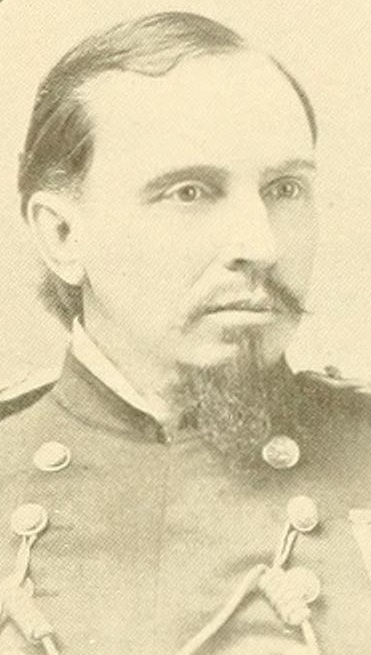
Henry Clay Wood

This mountain was originally named "Mount Clay Wood" in 1885 by Lieutenant Joseph P. O'Neil to honor his superior, Colonel Henry Clay Wood (1832–1918), Assistant Adjutant General, Department of the Columbia, who signed the orders for O'Neil's 1885 exploration of the Olympic Mountains. Mt. Claywood marks the expedition's deepest penetration from the north into the Olympic wilderness.

== Climate ==
Based on the Köppen climate classification, Mount Claywood is located in the marine west coast climate zone of western North America. Weather fronts originating in the Pacific Ocean travel northeast toward the Olympic Mountains. As fronts approach, they are forced upward by the peaks (orographic lift), causing them to drop their moisture in the form of rain or snow. As a result, the Olympics experience high precipitation, especially during the winter months in the form of snowfall. Because of maritime influence, snow tends to be wet and heavy, resulting in avalanche danger. During winter months weather is usually cloudy, but due to high pressure systems over the Pacific Ocean that intensify during summer months, there is often little or no cloud cover during the summer. The months July through September offer the most favorable weather for viewing or climbing this peak.

== Geology ==
The Olympic Mountains are composed of obducted clastic wedge material and oceanic crust, primarily Eocene sandstone, turbidite, and basaltic oceanic crust. The mountains were sculpted during the Pleistocene era by erosion and glaciers advancing and retreating multiple times.

== See also ==
- Olympic Mountains
- Geology of the Pacific Northwest
