= Sentinel Peak (Jefferson County, Washington) =

Mountain in Washington (state), United States

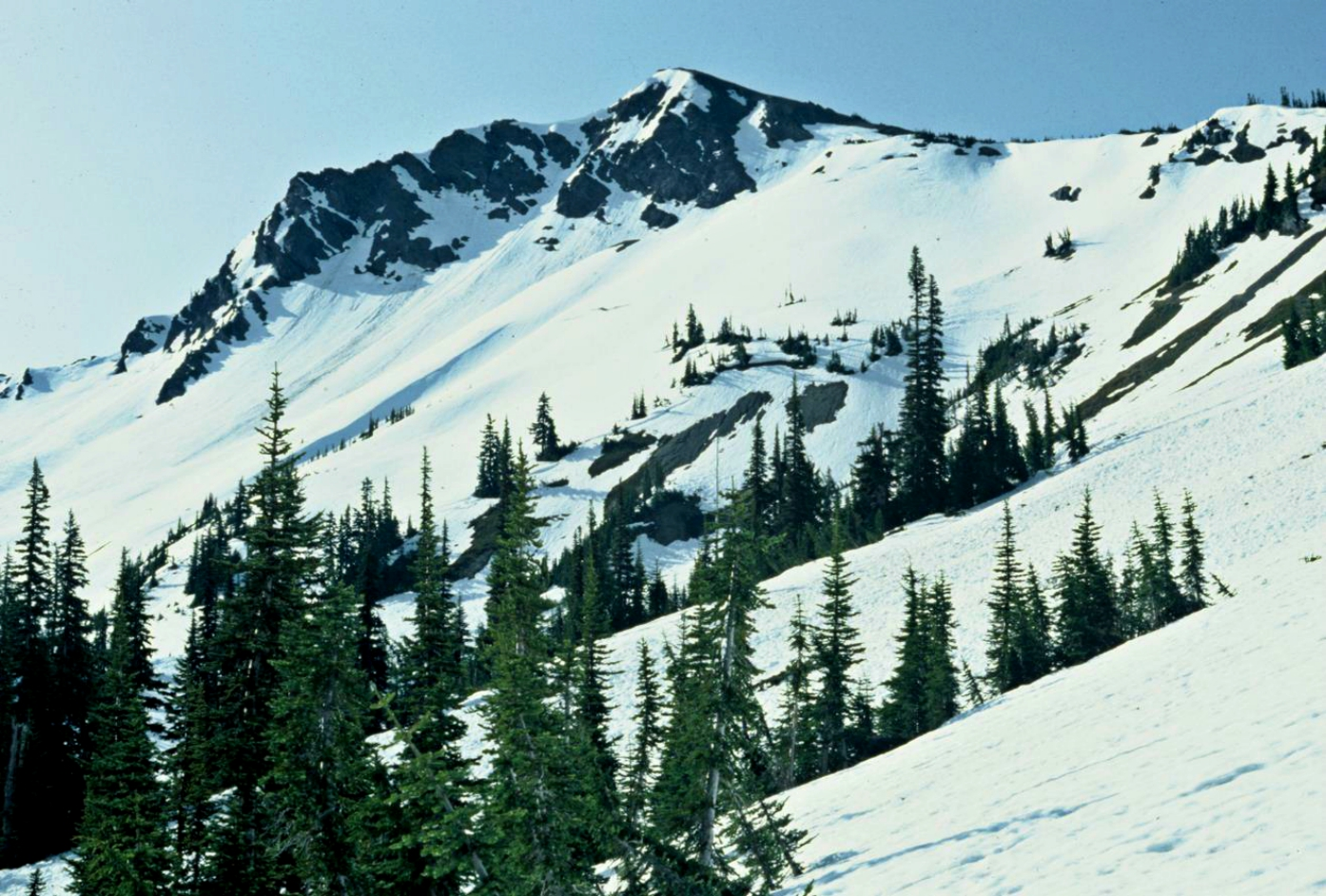
- Sentinel Peak in May 1992

Highest point
- Elevation: 6,592 ft (2,009 m)
- Prominence: 652 ft (199 m)
- Parent peak: Mount Claywood (6,836 ft)
- Isolation: 2.0 mi (3.2 km)
- Coordinates: 47°46′44″N 123°20′32″W

Geography
- Location within Washington (state) Location within the United States
- Country: United States
- State: Washington
- County: Jefferson
- Protected area: Olympic National Park
- Parent range: Olympic Mountains
- Topo map: USGS Wellesley Peak

Climbing
- Easiest route: Hiking class 1 via Hayden Pass

Sentinel Peak is a 6,592-foot-high (2,009 m) mountain summit located in the Olympic Mountains, in Jefferson County of Washington state. Rising in the center of Olympic National Park, its nearest higher neighbor is Mount Fromme, 1.42 miles (2.29 km) to the northwest. Sentinels Sister is a lower 6,301-foot-high (1,921 m) companion summit situated 0.65 miles (1.05 km) to the southwest. The two peaks stand as sentinels above the Dosewalips Valley and Hayden Pass, and were possibly named by an early expedition of the Seattle Mountaineers. Precipitation runoff from the peak drains to Hood Canal via the Dosewallips River.

== Climate ==
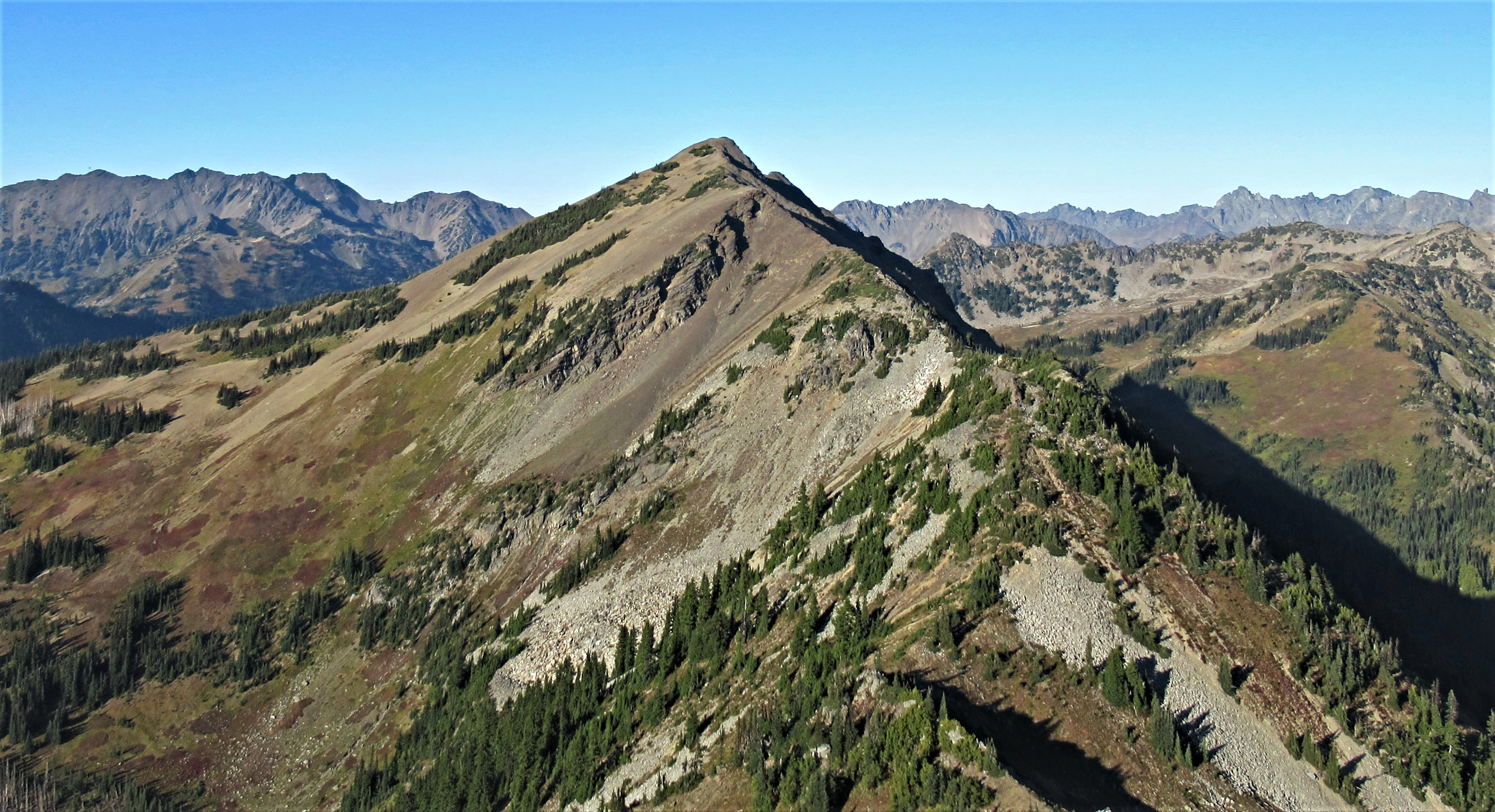
Southwest aspect

Based on the Köppen climate classification, Sentinel Peak is located in the marine west coast climate zone of western North America. Weather fronts originating in the Pacific Ocean travel northeast toward the Olympic Mountains. As fronts approach, they are forced upward by the peaks (orographic lift), causing them to drop their moisture in the form of rain or snow. As a result, the Olympics experience high precipitation, especially during the winter months in the form of snowfall. Because of maritime influence, snow tends to be wet and heavy, resulting in avalanche danger. During winter months weather is usually cloudy, but due to high pressure systems over the Pacific Ocean that intensify during summer months, there is often little or no cloud cover during the summer. The months of July through September offer the most favorable weather for viewing or climbing this peak.

== Geology ==
The Olympic Mountains are composed of obducted clastic wedge material and oceanic crust, primarily Eocene sandstone, turbidite, and basaltic oceanic crust. The mountains were sculpted during the Pleistocene era by erosion and glaciers advancing and retreating multiple times.

== See also ==
- Olympic Mountains
- Geology of the Pacific Northwest
- Geography of Washington (state)
