= Cameron Glaciers =

Glaciers in Washington, United States

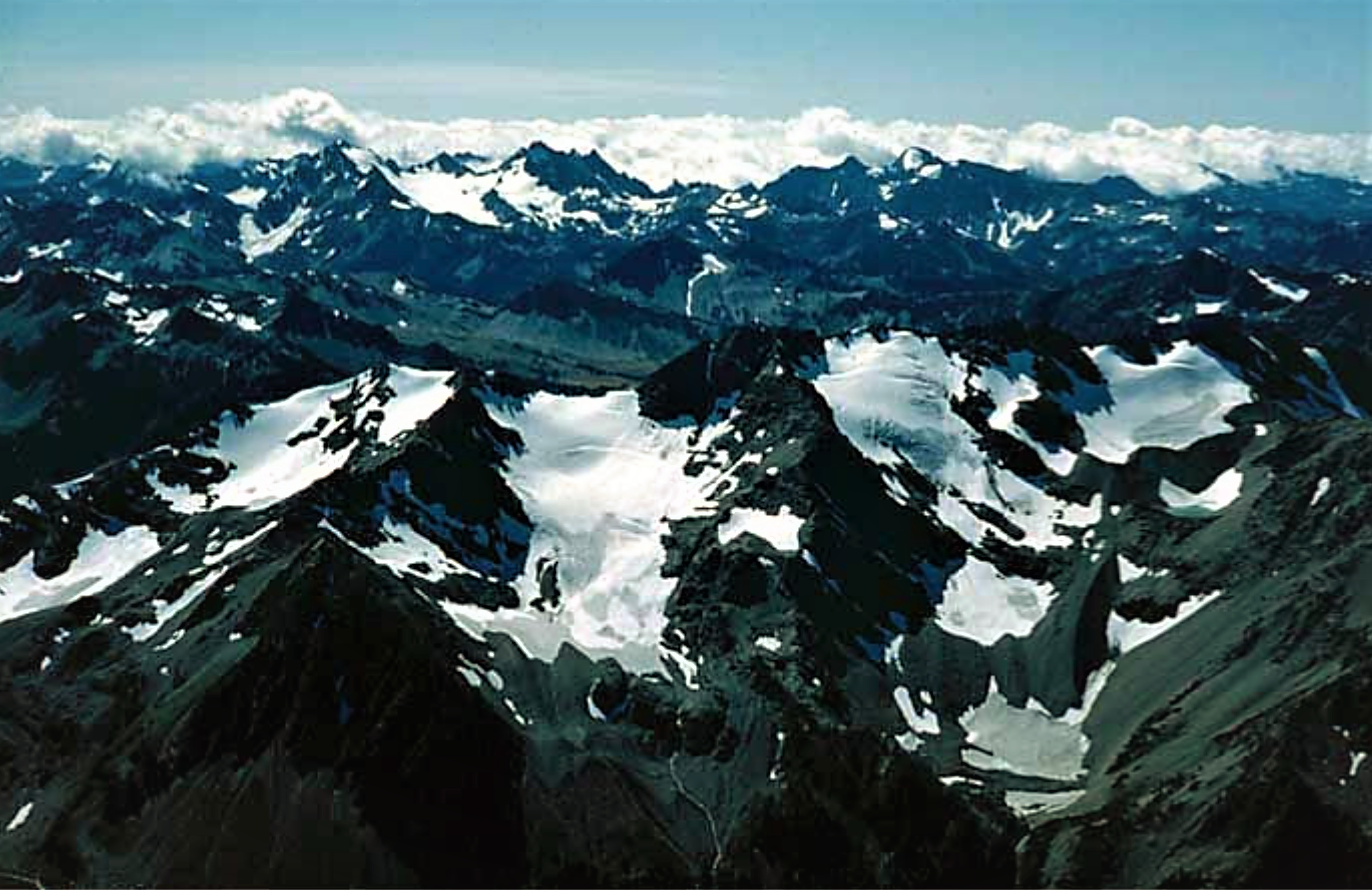

- Location within Washington (state)
- Type: Mountain glacier
- Location: Mount Cameron, Olympic National Park, Jefferson County, Washington, USA
- Coordinates: 47°49′39″N 123°19′25″W
- Length: .30 mi (0.48 km)
- Status: Retreating

The Cameron Glaciers are several ice bodies located on Mount Cameron in the Olympic Mountains in Olympic National Park. These glaciers are located in four north to northeast-facing cirques and range in elevation from about 6,700 feet (2,000 m) to just under 6,000 ft (1,800 m). The ice bodies in the easternmost, northeast-oriented cirque are the smallest, while the glacier just to the west is the largest. The westernmost two ice bodies are roughly equal in surface area. All bodies of ice located in these cirques are separated by arêtes. Meltwater from the glacier eventually enters Cameron Creek located to the north.

== See also ==
- List of glaciers in the United States
