= Lost Pass =

Mountain Pass in the Olympic Mountains

- Interactive map of Lost Pass
- Elevation: 5,571 ft (1,698 m)

Third Approach
- Location: Jefferson County, Washington, United States
- Range: Olympic Mountains
- Coordinates: 47°48′24″N 123°20′30″W
- Topo map: USGS Wellesley Peak

Lost Pass is a mountain pass crossed by hiking trail in the Olympic Mountains of the state of Washington. It is located on a high ridgeline that separates headwaters of the Dosewallips River from those of the Lost River, just to the west of Lost Peak in the Olympic National Park.
