= Mount Cameron =

Mount Cameron may refer to:

- Mount Cameron (Alaska), in the Chugach Mountains
- Mount Cameron (Antarctica)
- Mount Cameron (Colorado)
- Mount Cameron (Hong Kong), a hill in Hong Kong
- Mount Cameron (Washington), a mountain in Olympic National Park, US

== See also ==
- Mount Cameroon, in Cameroon
