= Mount Fromme (Washington) =

Mountain in Washington (state), United States

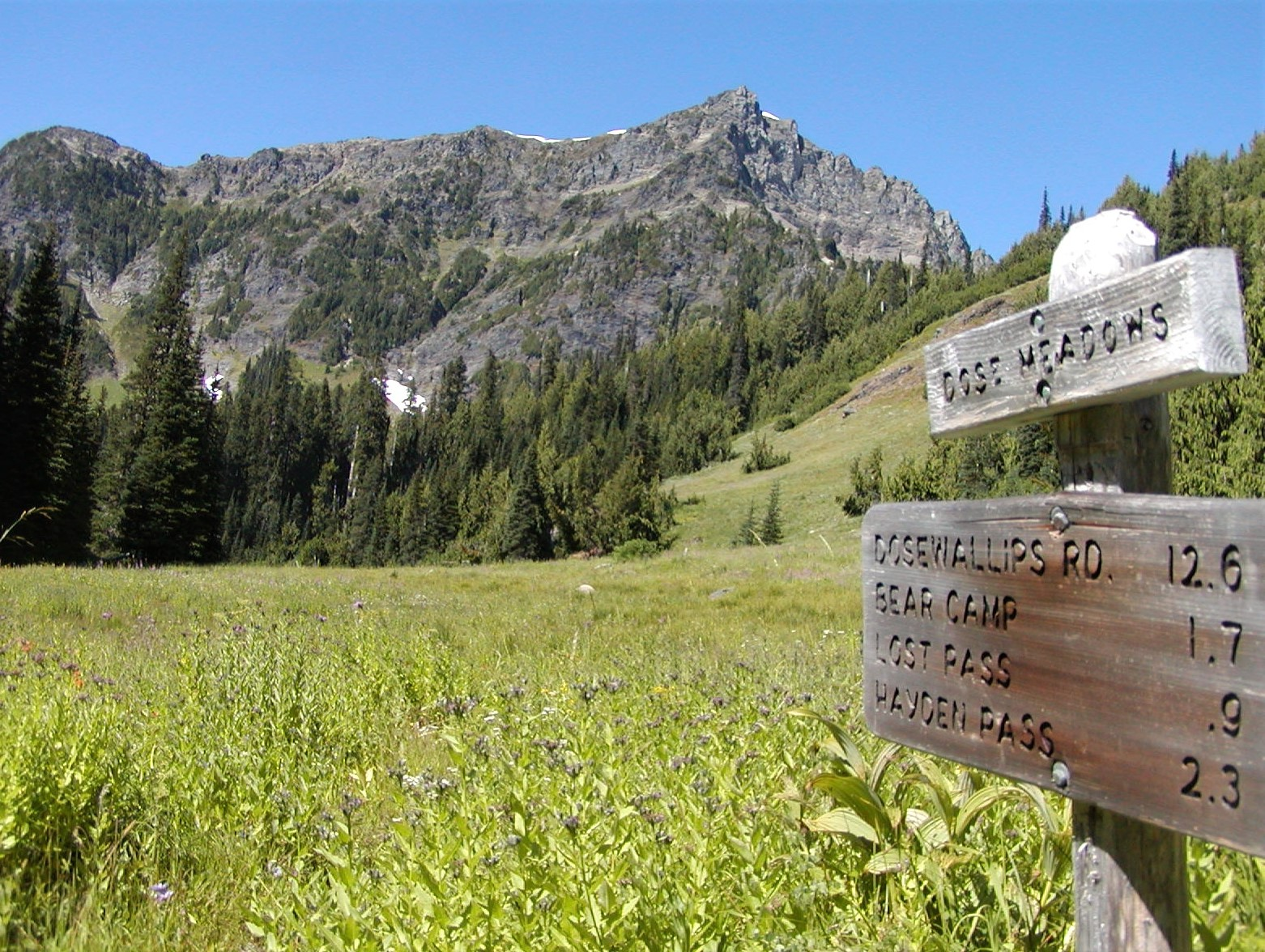
- East aspect, from Dose Meadows

Highest point
- Elevation: 6,705 ft (2,044 m)
- Prominence: 265 ft (81 m)
- Parent peak: Mount Claywood (6,836 ft)
- Isolation: 0.58 mi (0.93 km)
- Coordinates: 47°47′39″N 123°21′45″W

Naming
- Etymology: Rudo L. Fromme

Geography
- Location within Washington (state) Location within the United States
- Country: United States
- State: Washington
- County: Jefferson
- Protected area: Olympic National Park
- Parent range: Olympic Mountains
- Topo map: USGS Wellesley Peak

Geology
- Rock age: Eocene

Climbing
- First ascent: Unknown
- Easiest route: class 2 hiking via Hayden Pass

Mount Fromme is a 6,705-foot (2,044-metre) mountain summit in Olympic National Park in Jefferson County of Washington state. It is situated at the head of Dosewallips River, within the Daniel J. Evans Wilderness. The nearest higher neighbor is Mount Claywood, 0.6 mi (0.97 km) to the northwest. Other nearby peaks include Lost Peak, 1.8 mi (2.9 km) to the northeast, and Sentinel Peak, 1.4 mi (2.3 km) to the southeast. Precipitation runoff from the mountain drains east into headwaters of the Dosewallips River, and west into Hayes River, which is a tributary of the Elwha River. Topographic relief is significant as the summit rises 2,250 feet (685 m) above Dose Meadows in approximately one mile.

== History ==
The mountain was named in 1920 by The Mountaineers to honor Rudo Lorenzo Fromme (1882–1973), a supervisor for Olympic National Forest from 1913 through 1926. Rudo Fromme provided assistance to the club, which was building a trail. This geographical feature's name was officially adopted in 1961 by the U.S. Board on Geographic Names.

== Climate ==
Based on the Köppen climate classification, Mount Fromme is located in the marine west coast climate zone of western North America. Weather fronts originating in the Pacific Ocean travel northeast toward the Olympic Mountains. As fronts approach, they are forced upward by the peaks (orographic lift), causing them to drop their moisture in the form of rain or snow. As a result, the Olympics experience high precipitation, especially during the winter months in the form of snowfall. Because of maritime influence, snow tends to be wet and heavy, resulting in avalanche danger. During winter months weather is usually cloudy, but due to high pressure systems over the Pacific Ocean that intensify during summer months, there is often little or no cloud cover during the summer. The months June through September offer the most favorable weather for viewing or climbing this peak.

== Geology ==
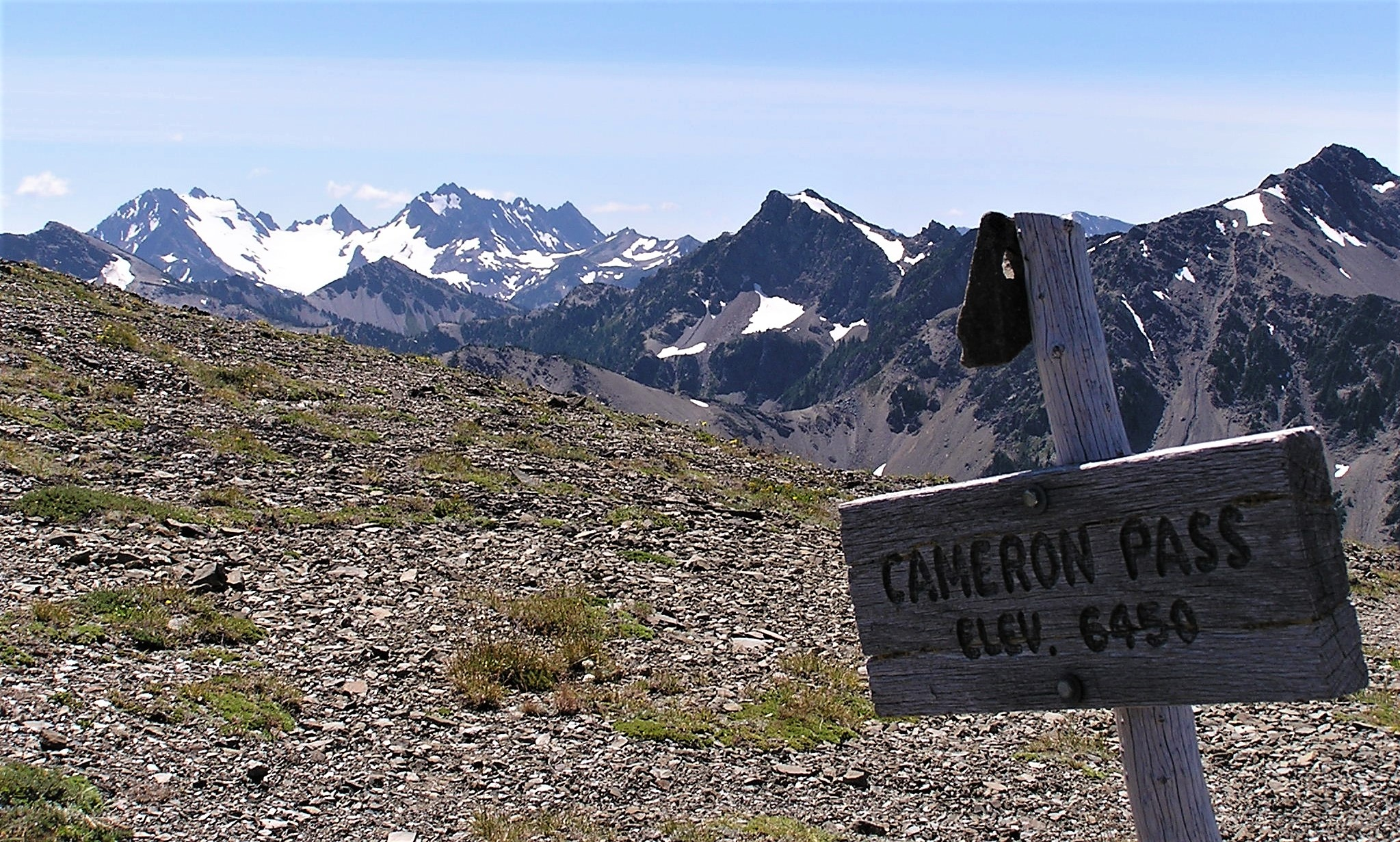
View from Cameron Pass with Mt. Fromme right of center, Mt. Claywood on right edge, Mt. Anderson/West Peak to left.

The Olympic Mountains are composed of obducted clastic wedge material and oceanic crust, primarily Eocene sandstone, turbidite, and basaltic oceanic crust. The mountains were sculpted during the Pleistocene era by erosion and glaciers advancing and retreating multiple times.

== See also ==
- Olympic Mountains
- Geology of the Pacific Northwest
