= Henry Clay Wood =

US Army officer and Medal of Honor recipient (1832–1918)

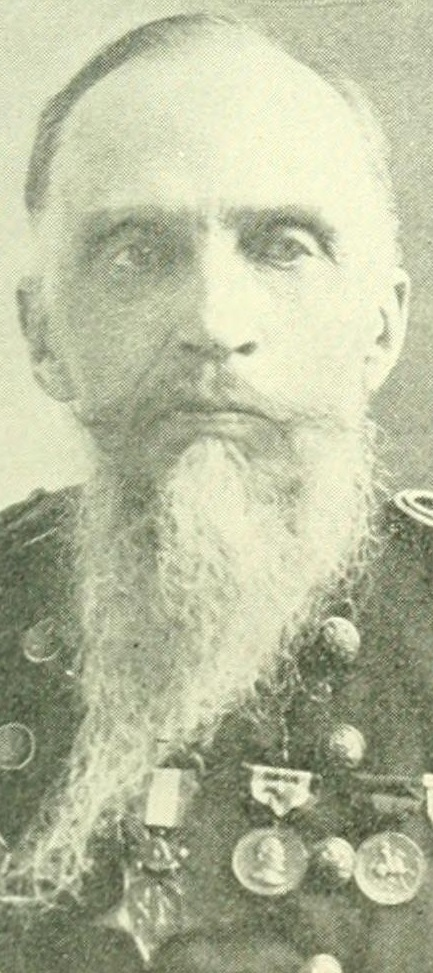
- From Volume 2 of 1911's Norwich University, 1819–1911
- Born: May 26, 1832; Winthrop, Maine, US
- Died: August 30, 1918 (aged 86); Portland, Maine, US
- Burial place: Arlington National Cemetery
- Spouse(s): Mary Frances Lord (d. 1866); Mary Ann (Ferguson) Bassett (d. 1909)
- Children: 2 (including Brigadier General Winthrop S. Wood)
- Military career
- Allegiance: United States of America; Union
- Branch: United States Army; Union Army
- Service years: 1856–1896
- Rank: Brigadier general
- Unit: U.S. Army Infantry Branch
- Conflicts: American Civil War: Battle of Wilson's Creek
- Awards: Medal of Honor

Henry Clay Wood (May 26, 1832 – August 30, 1918) was a career officer in the United States Army who attained the rank of brigadier general. A Union Army veteran of the American Civil War, he is most notable for his actions at the Battle of Wilson's Creek, which resulted in award of the Medal of Honor.

== Early life ==
H. Clay Wood was born in Winthrop, Maine on May 26, 1832, the son of Samuel Wood and Florence (Sweet) Wood. He was educated in the schools of Winthrop, followed by attendance at academies in Yarmouth and Farmington. In 1850, he began attendance at Bowdoin College, from which he received his Bachelor of Arts degree in 1854. After college he began to study medicine with a Maine physician, but gave it up to study law instead. He was admitted to the bar in 1856, and in 1857 he received his Master of Arts degree from Bowdoin.

== Start of career ==
Wood's father was a major general and division commander in the Maine Militia, and for several months in 1856 he served on his father's staff with the rank of major. During this period, Wood attended courses and lessons on military tactics and strategy at Norwich University, and in 1874 Norwich granted him a Bachelor of Science degree "in course" as though he had been a member of the Class of 1856. In June 1856, Wood received a commission as a second lieutenant of Infantry in the U.S. Army, and was assigned to the 1st Infantry Regiment in Texas. In May 1861, he was promoted to first lieutenant and assigned to the 11th Infantry Regiment.

== Civil War ==
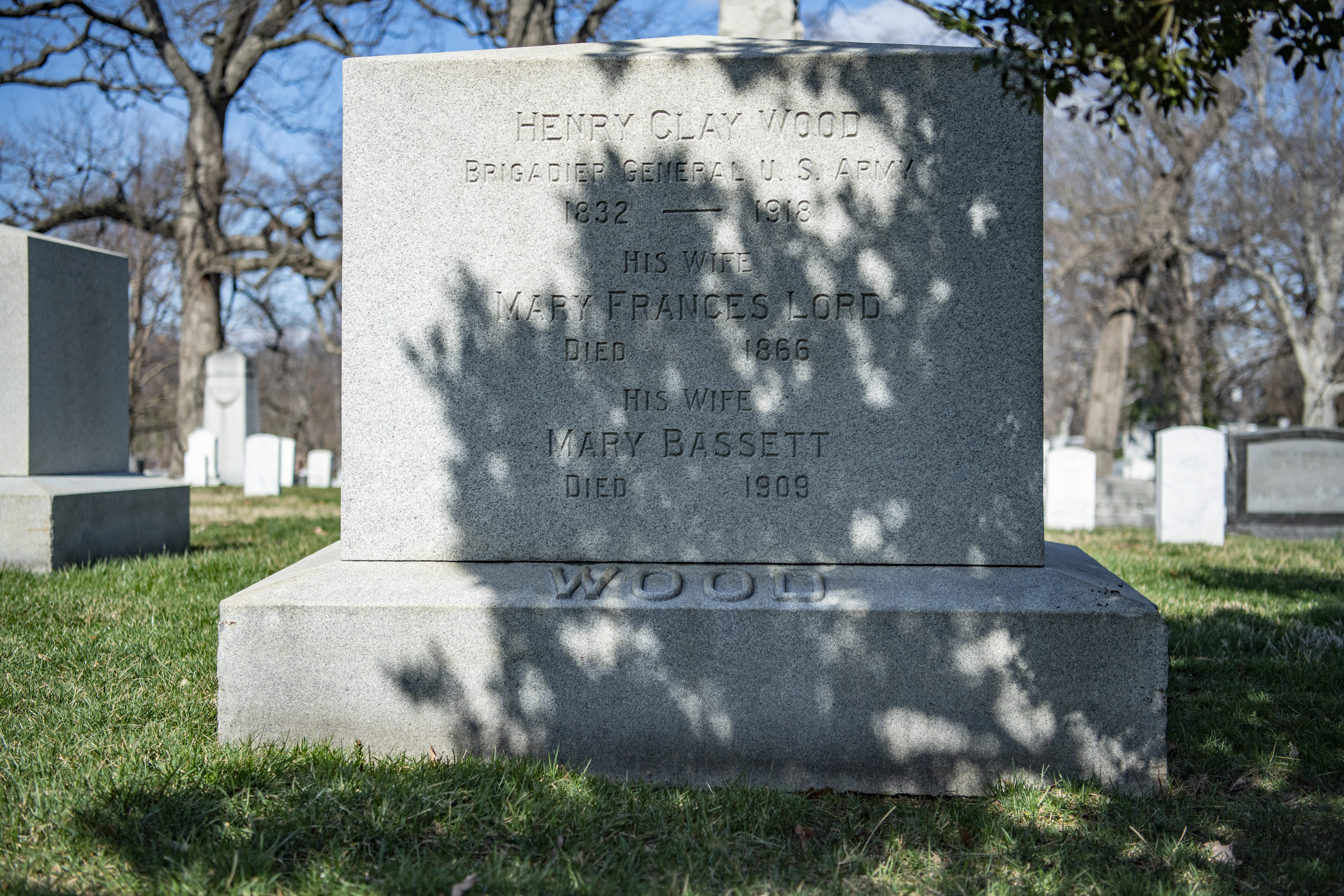
Grave at Arlington National Cemetery

After 1861 the onset of hostilities that commenced the American Civil War, Wood was assigned to units operating in Missouri as part of a larger force commanded by Nathaniel Lyon. As head of the Department of the West, Lyon endeavored to keep Missouri from seceding, and to prevent federal arms, ammunition and supplies from falling into the hands of the Confederacy. At the August 10, 1861 Battle of Wilson's Creek, Lyon's force was outnumbered by Confederates and defeated. Lyon was killed, but his efforts to keep Missouri from seceding gave the Union enough time to send more troops and secure the state under federal authority.

Wood was in command of a mounted rifle company at Wilson's Creek, and was wounded in the fighting. Despite numerous deaths and wounds among his men, as well as his own head wound, Wood prevented his company from breaking down during the battle, and then led it in covering an orderly retreat from the site of fighting at Ray's cornfield despite withdrawing while under heavy Confederate small arms fire. In 1893, Wood's heroism at Wilson's Creek resulted in award of the Medal of Honor.

In October, 1861 Wood was promoted to captain, and he served as a recruiting officer on the staff of John C. Frémont during Frémont's command of the Department of the West. He served at the War Department as a mustering officer and disbursing officer on the staff of the Army's Provost Marshal General, and he was promoted to major in June 1864. In March 1865, Wood received brevet promotion to lieutenant colonel for his heroism at Wilson's Creek, and to colonel to recognize his superior performance of duty in the Provost Marshal's office.

== Post-Civil War ==
After the war, Wood was assigned as assistant adjutant of the 3rd Military District of Georgia, and then the Department of the Columbia. In late 1874, Wood was involved in an incident in Portland, Oregon, site of the Department of the Columbia headquarters, where he became drunk and verbally insulted a junior officer in a public setting. Department commander Oliver Otis Howard, a fellow Maine native and Bowdoin graduate, upbraided Wood for using abusive language and other unspecified actions "too painful to speak of." Howard meted out no further punishment, conditioned on Wood's agreement to completely abstain from alcohol in the future. Wood recovered from this incident, and continued to serve as the department's adjutant. When Carl Schurz was responsible for administering American Indian policy as the Secretary of the Interior, he requested Wood's assignment as a liaison to negotiate with the tribes of the Pacific Northwest and persuade them to abandon their traditional homes and lifestyles for assignment to Indian reservations.

== Later career ==
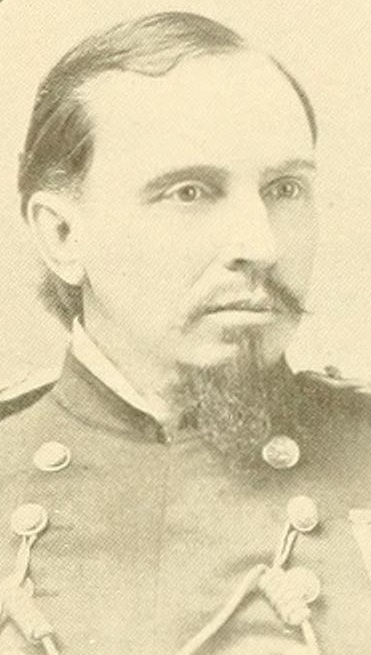
From 1892's Officers of the Army and Navy (Regular) Who Served in the Civil War

Wood was promoted to lieutenant colonel in February 1887, and colonel in November 1893. His later assignments included adjutant of the Department of the Lakes, the Department of Texas, and the Department of Dakota. Wood retired from the Army in May 1896. On April 23, 1904 Wood was promoted to brigadier general on the retired list.

== Retirement ==
In retirement, Wood was a resident of New York City. He was active in several fraternal and civic organizations, including the Freemasons, Royal Arch Masons, Knights Templar, and Society of Mayflower Descendants. He also was a companion of the New York Commandery of the Military Order of the Loyal Legion of the United States. He moved to Farmington, Maine in 1909.

== Death and burial ==
Wood died in Portland, Maine on August 30, 1918. He and his wives are buried at Arlington National Cemetery.

== Family ==
In 1860, Wood married Mary Frances Lord of Standish, Maine. She died in 1866, and in 1869 he married Mary Ann (Ferguson) Bassett of Washington, DC. Mary Ann Wood died in 1909.

With his first wife, Wood was the father of Harry Clifford Wood (b. 1863), a Harvard Law School graduate who practiced in several U.S. cities during his career, and Winthrop Samuel Wood (1865–1937), a United States Military Academy graduate who served in the Spanish–American War and World War I and attained the rank of brigadier general.

== Legacy ==
Mount Claywood, originally Mount Clay Wood, is a mountain in the Olympic Mountains of Washington state that is named in his honor.

== Sources ==
=== Books ===
- Ellis, William Arba (1911). Norwich University, 1819–1911; Her History, Her Graduates, Her Roll of Honor. Vol. 2. Montpelier, VT: Capital City Press.
- Fairbanks, Lorenzo Sayles (1897). Genealogy of the Fairbanks Family in America, 1633–1897. Boston, MA: American Printing and Engraving. p. 508.
- Sharfstein, Daniel J. (2017). Thunder in the Mountains: Chief Joseph, Oliver Otis Howard, and the Nez Perce War. New York: W.W. Norton & Co. ISBN 978-0-393-35565-9.
- Powell, William H.; Shippen, Edward (1892). Officers of the Army and Navy (Regular) Who Served in the Civil War. Philadelphia, PA: L.R. Hamersly & Co. p. 473.

=== Newspapers ===
- "Brig. Gen. Wood Dies At Home In Maine". the Evening Star. Washington, DC. September 3, 1918 – via Newspapers.com.

=== Internet ===
- "Gallery, Battle of Wilson's Creek: Henry Clay Wood". Civil War Virtual Museum: Trans-Mississippi Theater. Springfield, MO: Springfield-Greene County Library System. 2011.
- "Biography: Nathaniel Lyon". Washington, DC: Civil War Trust. 2018.
- "U.S. National Cemetery Interment Control Forms, 1928–1962, Entry for Winthrop S. Wood". Ancestry.com. Provo, UT: Ancestry.com, LLN. April 13, 1927.
