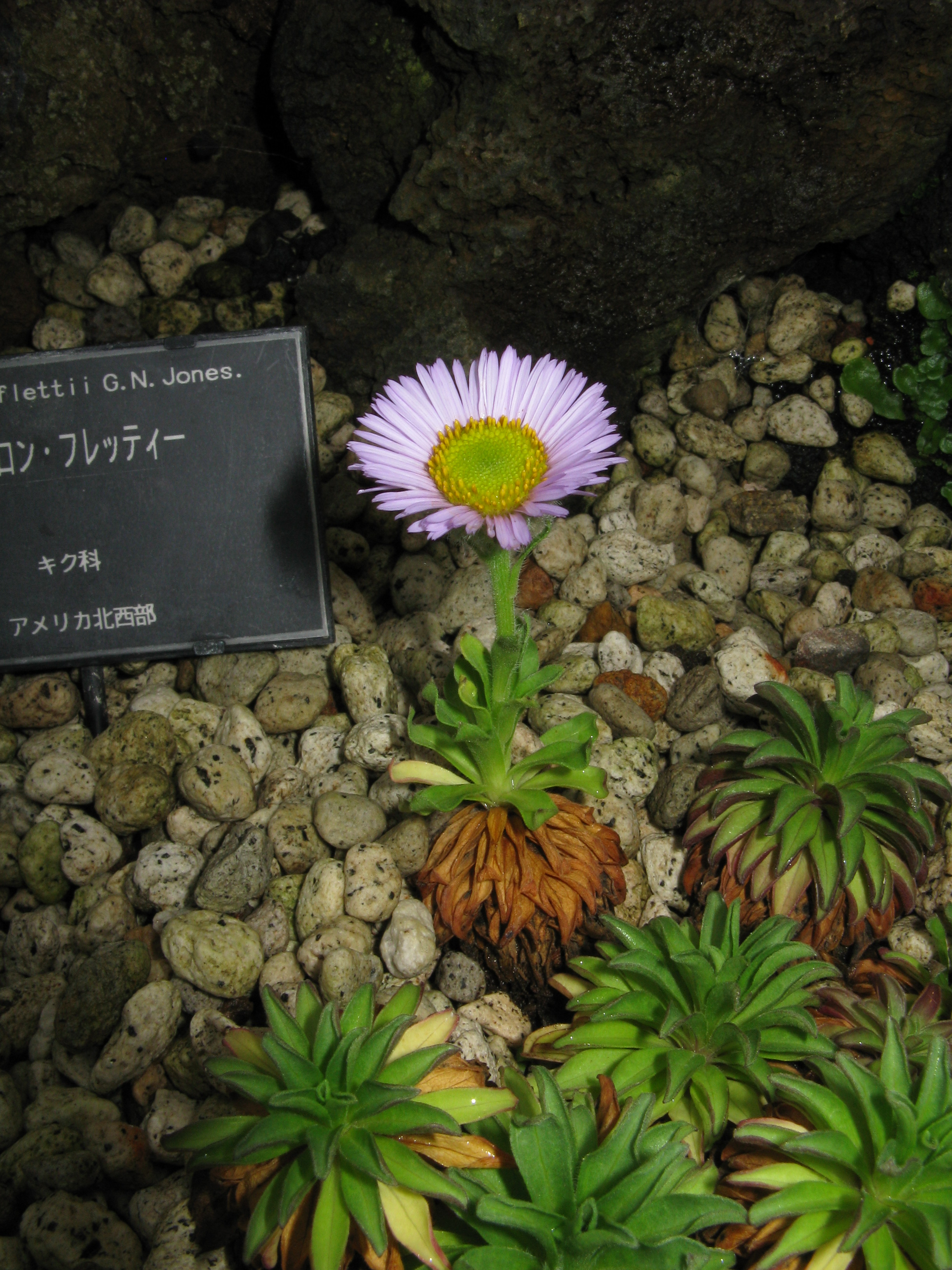

Scientific classification
- Kingdom: Plantae
- Clade: Tracheophytes
- Clade: Angiosperms
- Clade: Eudicots
- Clade: Asterids
- Order: Asterales
- Family: Asteraceae
- Genus: Erigeron
- Species: E. flettii

Binomial name
- Erigeron flettii G.N.Jones

= Erigeron flettii =

Species of flowering plant

Erigeron flettii is a rare North American species of flowering plants in the family Asteraceae known by the common names Flett's fleabane or Olympic Mountains fleabane .

Erigeron flettii is endemic to the Olympic Peninsula in the State of Washington. Many of the populations lie inside Olympic National Park.

Erigeron flettii is a small perennial herb up to 15 centimeters (8 inches) in height. Most of the leaves are clustered around the base of the stems. They are lance-shaped, dark green on most of the blade but with white along the edge. The plant generally produces only 1 flower head per stem, each head as many as 40 white ray florets surrounding numerous yellow disc florets.
