= Grand Pass (Washington) =

- Interactive map of Grand Pass
- Elevation: 6,348 ft (1,935 m)

Third Approach
- Location: Jefferson County, Washington, United States
- Range: Olympic Mountains
- Coordinates: 47°51′56″N 123°21′20″W
- Topo map: USGS Wellesley Peak

Grand Pass is a mountain pass in the Olympic Mountains in the state of Washington. It is in the Olympic National Park.
