= Mount Cameron (Washington) =

Mountain in Washington (state), United States

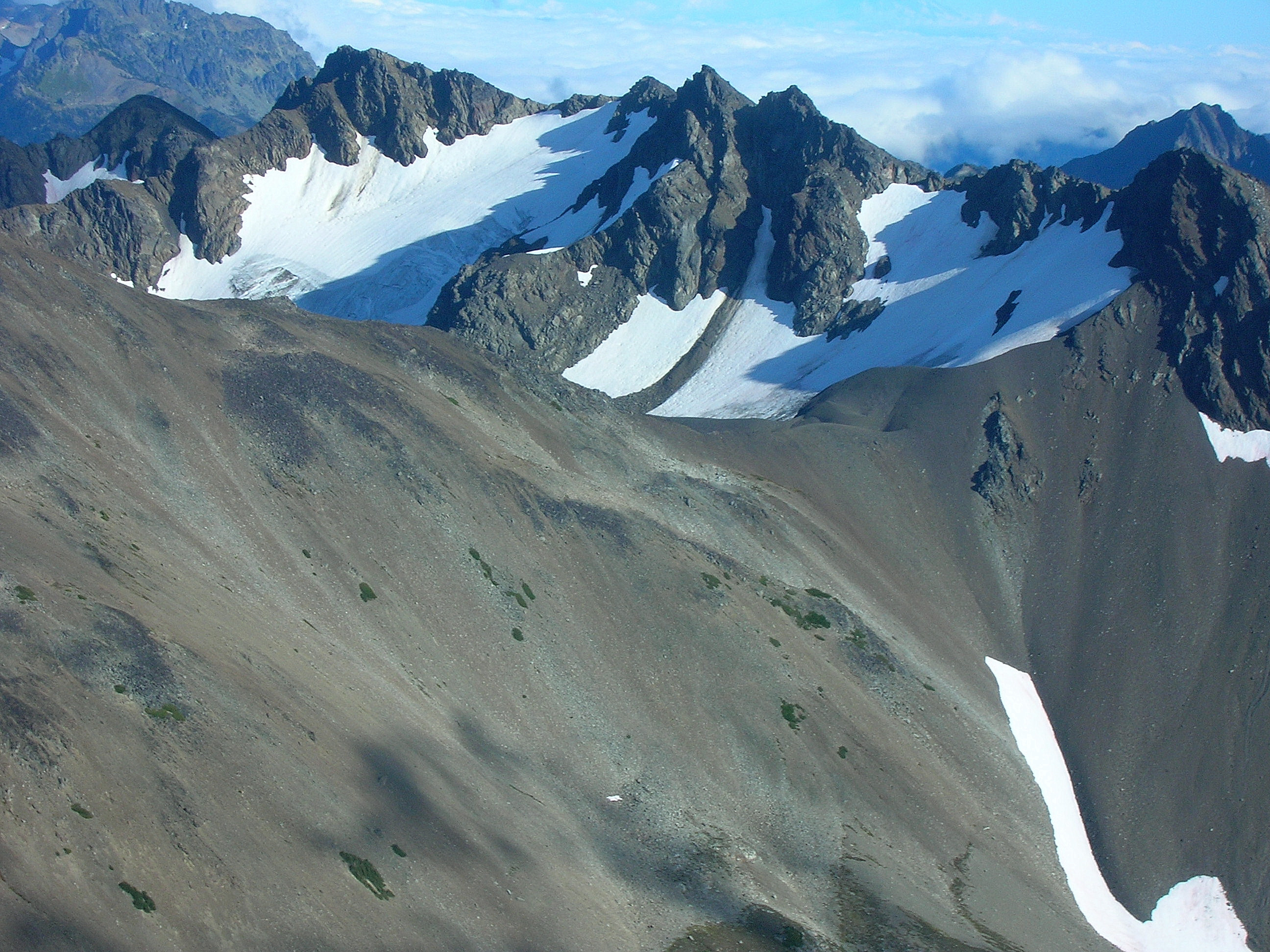
- North aspect of Mt. Cameron

Highest point
- Elevation: 7,190 ft (2,192 m)
- Prominence: 990 ft (302 m)
- Parent peak: Mount Johnson (7,680 ft)
- Isolation: 4.52 mi (7.27 km)
- Coordinates: 47°49′31″N 123°19′42″W

Geography
- Location within Washington (state) Location within the United States
- Country: United States
- State: Washington
- County: Jefferson
- Protected area: Olympic National Park
- Parent range: Olympic Mountains
- Topo map: USGS Wellesley Peak

Geology
- Rock age: Eocene

Climbing
- Easiest route: class 2 scrambling

Mount Cameron is a 7,190-foot-elevation (2,192-meter) triple-summit mountain located within Olympic National Park in Jefferson County of Washington state. Mount Cameron is situated 21 miles southwest of Sequim, and set within the Daniel J. Evans Wilderness. Topographic relief is significant as the southeast aspect rises over 3,300 feet (1,000 meters) above the Dosewallips River in approximately one mile. Precipitation runoff from the mountain drains south into the Dosewallips River, north to the Gray Wolf River via Cameron Creek, and west into headwaters of Lost River. Neighbors include line parent Mount Deception, 4.5 mi (7.2 km) to the east, and proximate parent Mount Johnson, 4.5 mi (7.2 km) to the east.

== Etymology ==
This landform's toponym was officially adopted in 1969 by the U.S. Board on Geographic Names. This mountain, Cameron Pass, Cameron Glaciers, Cameron Creek, and Cameron Basin are named after Amos Benson Cameron (1872–1951), an early settler of this area who homesteaded for 41 years in the Deer Park area with his wife and 14 children. He pioneered the first trail into Cameron Basin.

== Climate ==
Based on the Köppen climate classification, Mount Cameron is located in the marine west coast climate zone of western North America. Weather fronts originating in the Pacific Ocean travel northeast toward the Olympic Mountains. As fronts approach, they are forced upward by the peaks (orographic lift), causing them to drop their moisture in the form of rain or snow. As a result, the Olympics experience high precipitation, especially during the winter months in the form of snowfall. Because of maritime influence, snow tends to be wet and heavy, resulting in avalanche danger. During winter months weather is usually cloudy, but due to high pressure systems over the Pacific Ocean that intensify during summer months, there is often little or no cloud cover during the summer. The months June through September offer the most favorable weather for viewing or climbing this mountain.

== Geology ==
The Olympic Mountains are composed of obducted clastic wedge material and oceanic crust, primarily Eocene sandstone, turbidite, and basaltic oceanic crust. The mountains were sculpted during the Pleistocene era by erosion and glaciers advancing and retreating multiple times.

== Gallery ==
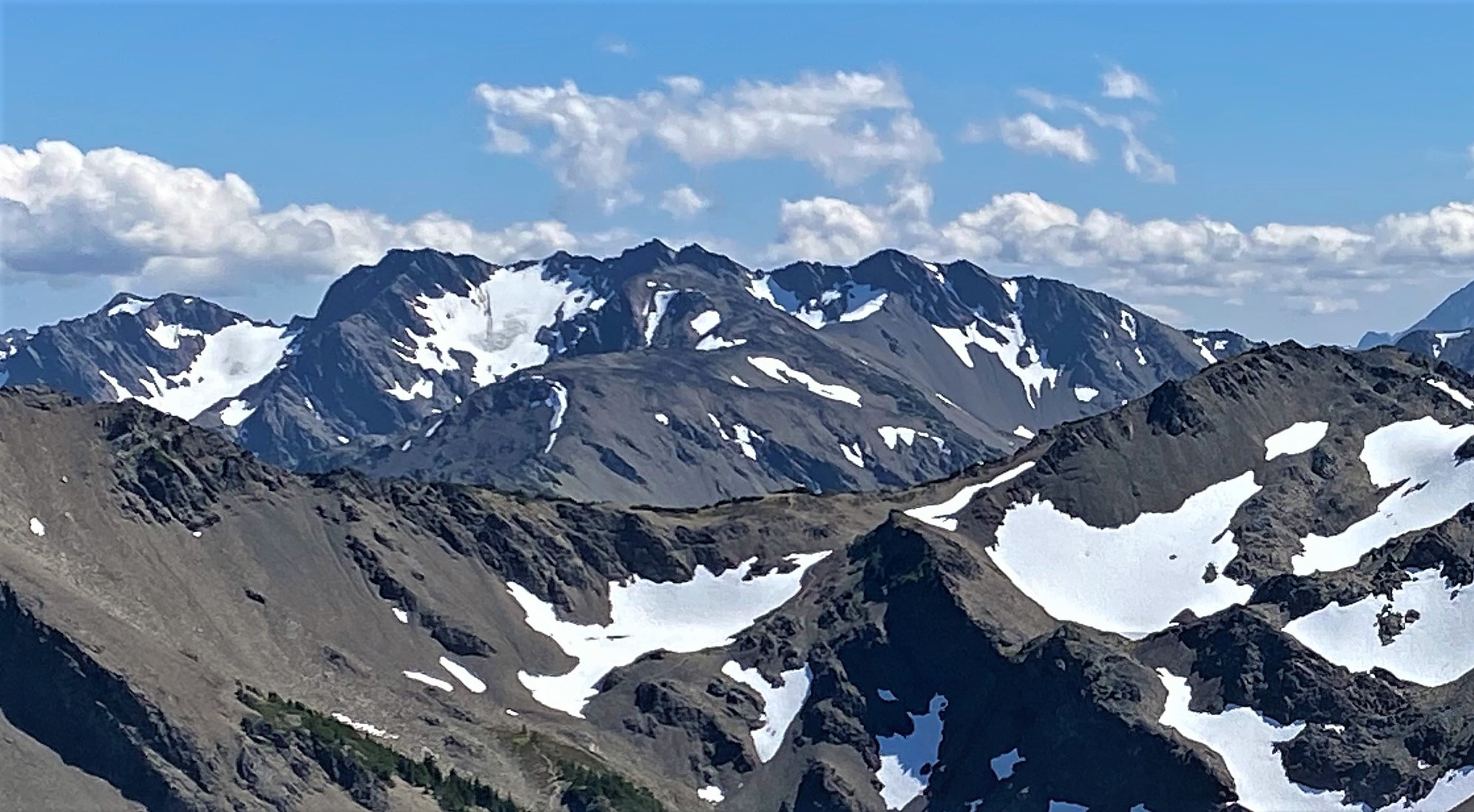
North aspect of Mount Cameron

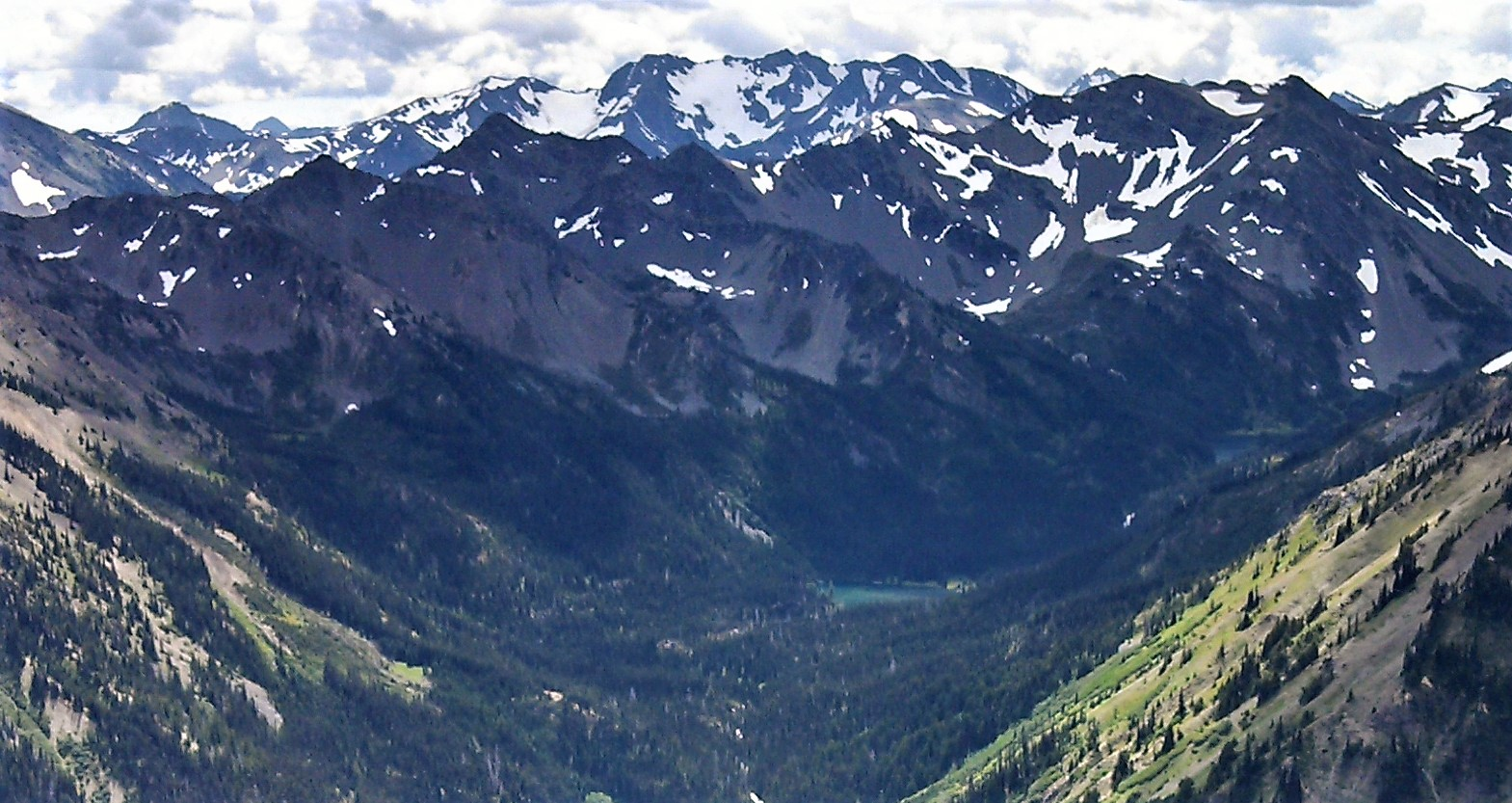
North aspect of Mount Cameron centered at top,
as viewed from Elk Mountain

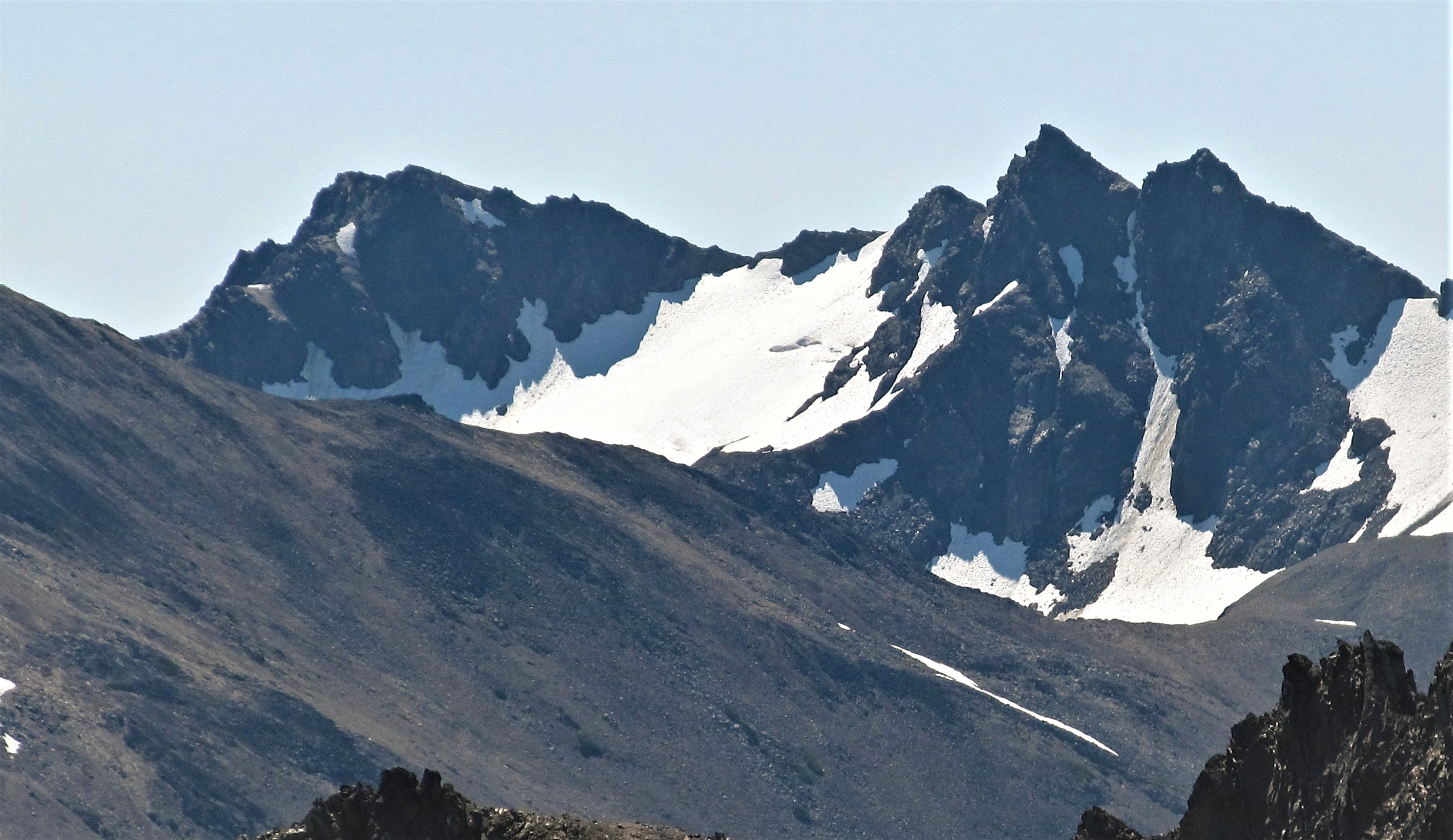

== See also ==
- Olympic Mountains
- Geology of the Pacific Northwest
