= Olympic Mountains =

Mountain range in Washington, United States

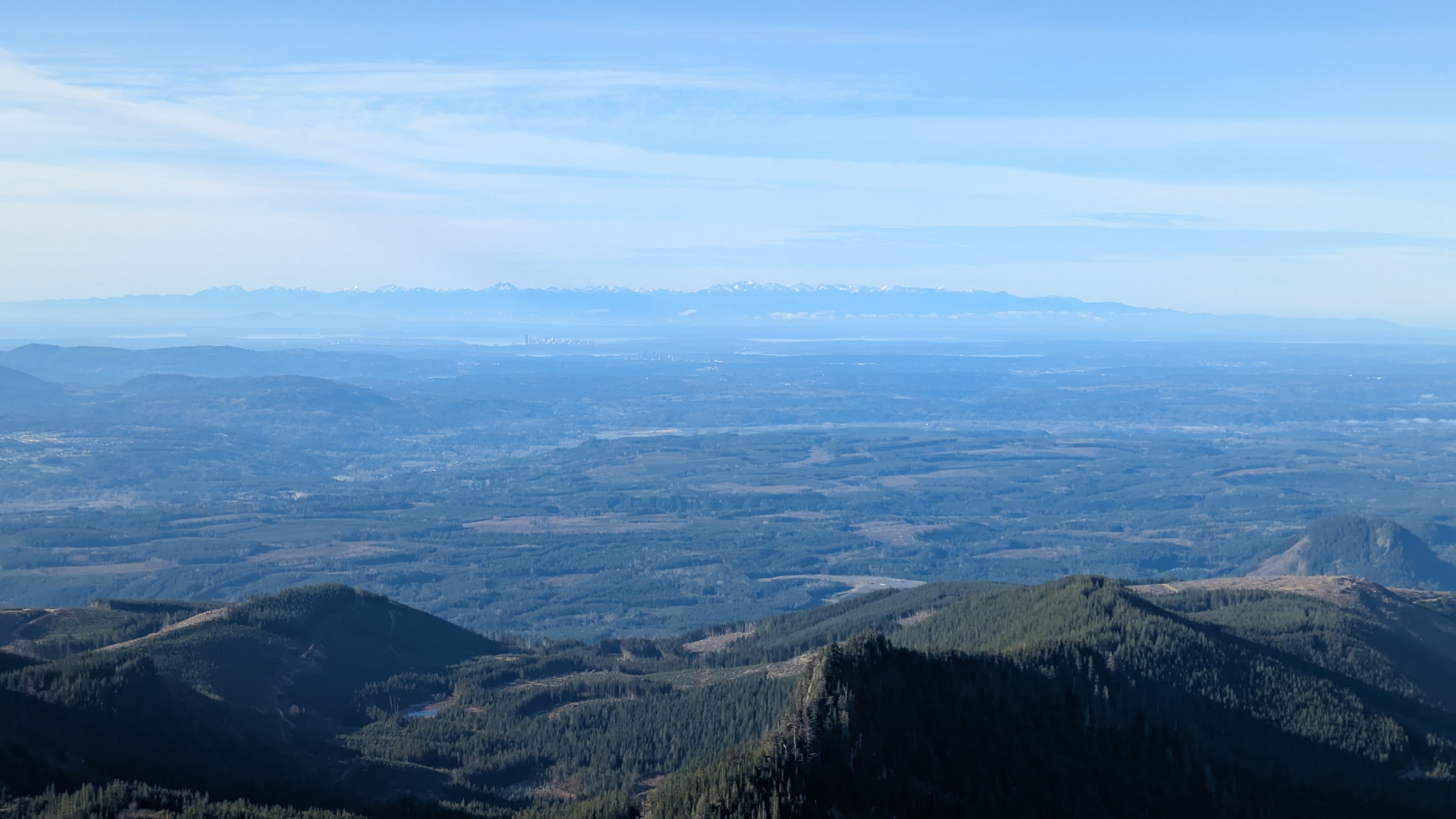
- The Olympics beyond Puget Sound and the Seattle metropolitan area, from the western Cascades

Highest point
- Peak: Mount Olympus
- Elevation: 7,980 ft (2,430 m) NAVD 88
- Listing: Mountain ranges in Washington
- Coordinates: 47°48′04″N 123°42′39″W

Geography
- Location within Washington (state)
- Country: United States
- State: Washington
- Counties: Clallam; Grays Harbor; Jefferson; Mason
- Protected areas: Olympic National Park; Olympic National Forest
- Range coordinates: 47°50′N 123°50′W
- Parent range: Pacific Coast Ranges

The Olympic Mountains are a mountain range on the Olympic Peninsula of the Pacific Northwest of the United States. The mountains, part of the Pacific Coast Ranges, are not especially high – Mount Olympus is the highest summit at 7,980 ft (2,432 m); however, the eastern slopes rise precipitously out of Puget Sound from sea level, and the western slopes are separated from the Pacific Ocean by the low-lying 20 to 35 km (12 to 22 mi) wide Pacific Ocean coastal plain. These densely forested western slopes are the wettest place in the 48 contiguous states. Most of the mountains are protected within the bounds of Olympic National Park and adjoining segments of Olympic National Forest.

The mountains are located in western Washington in the United States, spread out across four counties: Clallam, Grays Harbor, Jefferson and Mason. Physiographically, they are a section of the larger Pacific Border province, which is in turn a part of the larger Pacific Mountain System.

== Geography ==
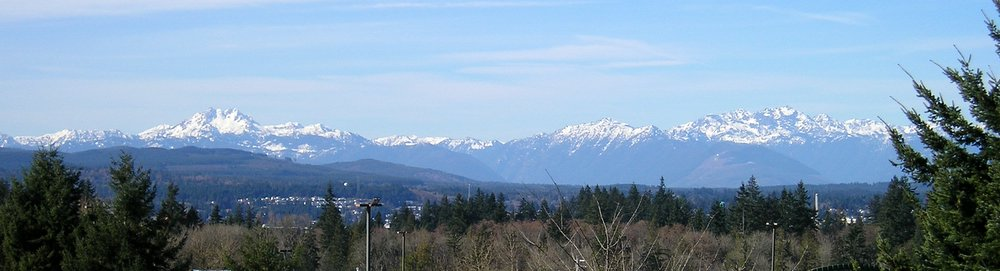
The Olympic Mountains in winter, as seen from the east. The Brothers is the large double peak on the left, and Mount Constance is on the right.

The Olympics have the form of a domed cluster of steep-sided peaks surrounded by heavily forested foothills and incised by deep valleys. They are surrounded by water on three sides, separated from the Pacific by the 20 to 35 km (12 to 22 mi) wide coastal plain. The general form of the range is more or less circular, or somewhat horseshoe-shaped, and the drainage pattern is radial.

Rivers radiate outwards to all sides. Clockwise from windward to leeward, the major watersheds are: Satsop, Wynoochee, Humptulips, Quinault, Queets, Hoh, Bogachiel, Sol Duc (all flowing west into the Pacific Ocean; with the Satsop, Wynoochee by way of the Chehalis River, the Humptulips by way of Grays Harbor at the mouth of the Chehalis River, and the Bogachiel and Sol Duc forming the Quillayute River within 5 miles (8.0 km) of tidewater), Lyre, Elwha, Dungeness (all flowing north into the Strait of Juan de Fuca); and the Big Quilcene, Dosewallips, Duckabush, Hamma Hamma, and Skokomish (all flowing east into Hood Canal).

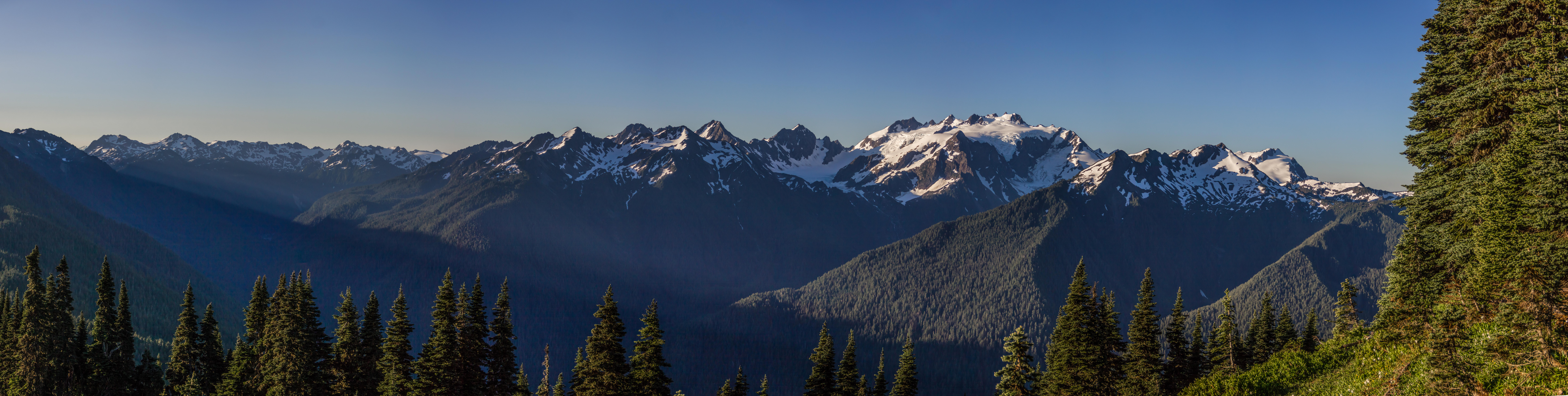
The Olympic Mountains seen from the High Divide.

=== List of summits ===
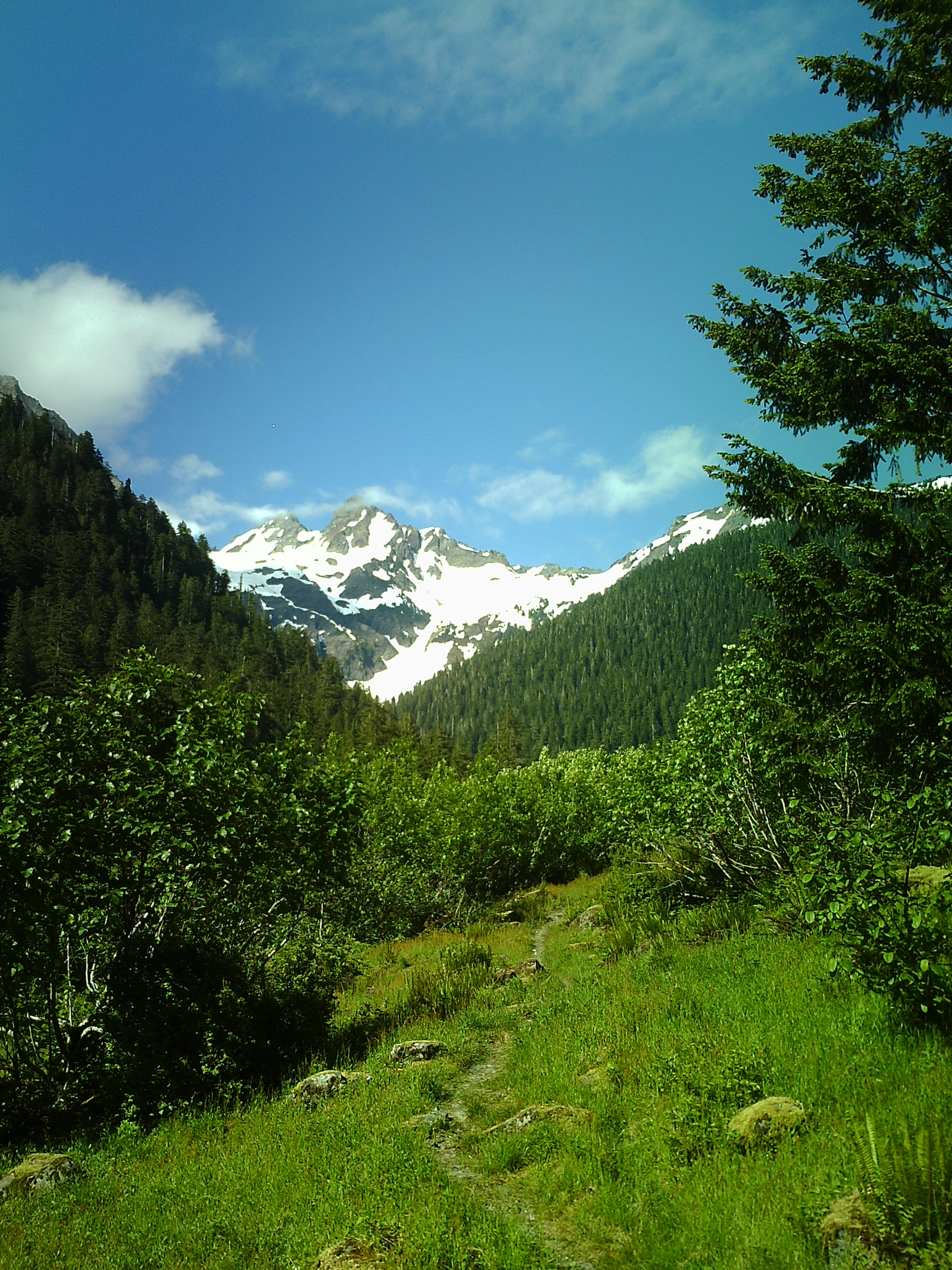
Mount Anderson as seen from the East Fork of the Quinault River

Principal summits:

- Mount Olympus – highest point, eight glaciers
- Mount Constance – tallest visible from Seattle and third highest Olympic peak
- Mount Townsend – highly visible from Seattle at far northeast of the Olympics (technically in the Buckhorn Wilderness)
- Mount Anderson – West Peak of Mount Anderson is the hydrographic apex of the Olympic Mountains: From this peak, rivers flow outward to the Pacific Ocean, the Strait of Juan de Fuca, and Hood Canal.
- The Brothers – double peak visible from Seattle
- Mount Deception – second highest Olympic peak
- Mount Washington
- Mount Angeles
- Mount Stone
- Mount Ellinor

Other summits:

- Boulder Peak – located in the Elwha River area
- Mount Storm King – located above the east end of Lake Crescent
- Hurricane Ridge – road accessible mountain viewpoint near Port Angeles

=== Other features ===
- Bailey Range
- Lost Pass

=== Protected areas ===
A large portion of the range is contained within the Olympic National Park. Of this portion, 95% is part of the Daniel J. Evans Wilderness.

The national park is surrounded on the south, east, and northwest sides by the Olympic National Forest, with five wilderness areas, and on the southwest side by the Clearwater State Forest with one Natural Area Preserve (Washington Department of Natural Resources), and the Quinault Indian Reservation. State parks and wildlife areas occur in the lower elevations.

=== Climate ===
Precipitation varies greatly throughout the range, from the wet western slopes to the semi-arid eastern ridges. Mount Olympus, nearly 8,000 feet (2,400 m) tall, is a mere 35 miles (56 km) from the Pacific Ocean, accounting for the high precipitation of the area, with an estimated 240 inches (6,100 mm) of snow and rain on Mount Olympus. 140 to 170 inches (3,600 to 4,300 mm) of rain falls on the Hoh Rainforest annually, receiving the most measured precipitation of anywhere in the contiguous United States. Areas to the northeast of the mountains are located in a rain shadow cast by the mountain themselves, and receive as little as 16 in (410 mm) of precipitation around the city of Sequim. Annual precipitation increases to about 30 in (760 mm) on the edges of the rain shadow around Port Townsend, the San Juan Islands, and the city of Everett across Puget Sound. 80% of precipitation falls during the winter months. On the coastal plain, the winter temperature stays between −2 and 7 °C (28 and 45 °F). During the summer it warms up to between 10 and 24 °C (50 and 75 °F), with occasional hot spell days reaching to the upper 80s to low 90s °F (30–35 °C).

The large number of snowfields and glaciers, reaching down to 1,500 m (5,000 ft) above sea level, are a consequence of the high precipitation, northern latitude, and cool moderating climate adjacent to the Pacific Ocean. There are about 184 glaciers and permanent ice fields crowning the Olympics peaks. The most prominent glaciers are those on Mount Olympus covering approximately 10 square miles (26 km^{2}). Beyond the Olympic complex are the glaciers of Mount Carrie and others in the Bailey Range, Mount Christie, Mount Queets, and Mount Anderson, however most of these have experienced significant decrease in both length and mass in recent decades, with several disappearing completely in the driest northeastern portion of the mountains. Due to global warming, glaciers in the Olympics are expected to largely disappear by 2070.

== Geology ==
The Olympics are made up of obducted clastic wedge material and oceanic crust. They are primarily Eocene sandstones, turbidites, and basaltic oceanic crust. Unlike the Cascades, the Olympic Mountains are not volcanic, and contain no native granite.

Millions of years ago, vents and fissures opened under the Pacific Ocean and lava flowed forth, creating huge underwater volcanic mountains and ranges called seamounts. The Farallon tectonic plate that formed a part of the Pacific Ocean floor (separate from the Pacific plate) inched eastward toward North America about 35 million years ago and most of the sea floor subducted beneath the continental land mass of the North America plate. Some of the sea floor, however, was scraped off and jammed against the mainland, creating the dome that was the forerunner of today's Olympics. In this particular case, the future Olympics were being jammed into a corner created by the Vancouver Island and North Cascades microcontinents attached to the western edge of the North America plate. This is thought to be the origin of the curved shape of the Olympic Basaltic Horseshoe, an arc of submarine basalt running east along the Strait of Juan de Fuca, south along Hood Canal, and then west to Lake Quinault. Thrust-faulting northeast into the Vancouver Island/North Cascades corner pushes Olympic rock upward and southwestward, resulting in strata that appear to be standing on edge and that intermix with strata of different mineral composition. All this occurred under water; the Olympics began to rise above the sea only 10–20 million years ago.

The Olympics were shaped in the Pleistocene era by both alpine and continental glaciers advancing and retreating multiple times. The valleys of the Hoh, Queets, and Quinault rivers are typical U-shaped valleys carved by advancing alpine glaciers. Piles of talus and rockfall were created by retreating alpine glaciers. In the high mountains, the major rivers have their headwaters in alpine glacially carved cirques. During the Orting, followed by the Stuck, the Salmon Springs, and the Fraser glaciations, the vast continental Cordilleran Ice Sheet descended from Alaska south through British Columbia to the Olympics. The ice split into the Juan de Fuca and Puget ice lobes, as they encountered the resistant Olympic Mountains, carving out the current waterways and advanced as far south as present day Olympia. Ice flowed up the river valleys as far as 3,800 feet (1,200 m), carrying granitic glacial erratics with it.

== Ecology ==
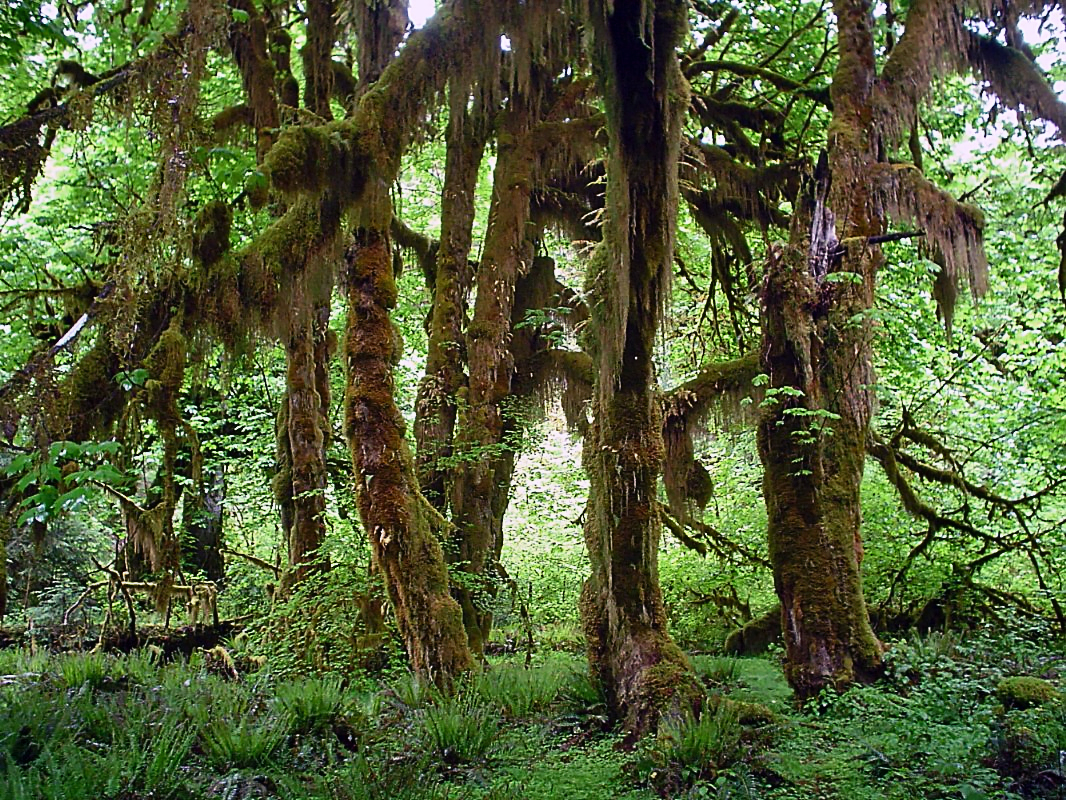
The Hoh Rainforest supports many trees and epiphytes.

The mountains support a variety of different ecosystems, varying by elevation and relative east–west location, which influences the local climate, primarily precipitation.

=== Flora ===
Olympic forests are coniferous forests, unique among mesic temperate forests in their almost complete dominance by conifers rather than by hardwoods. The hardwood:conifer timber volume ratio is 1:1,000 in the maritime Pacific Northwest. Another unique feature of Olympic forests is the size and longevity of the dominant tree species. Every coniferous genus represented here is represented by its largest and longest-lived species, and some of its second and third ranked species as well. Biomass accumulations are among the highest in the temperate forest zones. Dominance of conifers is thought to be a result of the amount and timing of precipitation. The dry summers limit the growth of deciduous trees, such as most hardwoods. Evergreens, such as most conifers, are able to take advantage of the winter precipitation by continuing to photosynthesize through fall, winter and early spring, when deciduous trees are not able to photosynthesize. No deciduous conifers occur in the Olympics; larch trees occur in the much-drier eastern Cascades, but not in the Olympics or western Cascades. There is only one species of evergreen hardwood, the madrone. The great size and age of conifers here is thought to be a result of the relative lack of frequent windstorms like tropical cyclones.

Along the western flanks of the mountains the increased orographic precipitation supports temperate rain forests in the Quinault, Queets, Hoh, and Bogachiel river valleys at low elevations. Protection by Olympic National Park has allowed these rain forests to retain old growth trees, which supports a varied ecosystem. The Olympic rain forests are composed primarily of Sitka spruce and western hemlock, as are the surrounding lowland Sitka spruce forests, but are distinct in having a relative abundance of groves of bigleaf maple and vine maple, which support large epiphytic communities of mosses, lichens, ferns, and clubmosses; an abundance of nurse logs on the forest floor; a relatively open forest canopy and sparse shrub layer; and a dense moss layer on the forest floor. The rain forests are the wintering grounds for herds of Roosevelt elk and it is thought that browsing by the elk is responsible for the open shrub layer and the dominance of Sitka spruce over western hemlock.

The rain forests are just one type of forest found in the Olympic Mountains. Franklin and Dyrness set out 5 forest zones: Sitka spruce, western hemlock, silver fir, mountain hemlock, and subalpine parkland. Other authors include a sixth, Douglas-fir zone. Different plant associations are typical of one or more forest zones. For instance, the rain forest plant association described above is a member of the Sitka spruce forest zone.

The Sitka spruce zone is a lowland zone dominated by Sitka spruce and western hemlock. Precipitation is high, winters are mild, elevations are low. This forest zone is typically found at very low elevations on the western coastal plain and not in mountainous areas, although it can be found as high as 1,900 feet (580 m).

The lower elevations of the Olympic mountains, from roughly 480 feet (150 m) up to 1,800 feet (550 m) – 3,700 feet (1,100 m), feature the western hemlock zone, so-called because in most of the zone, the climax tree species would be western hemlock, even though much of the area is dominated by Douglas-fir. The reason for this is that Douglas-fir is an early seral species, and reproduces primarily after disturbances such as fire, logging, landslides, and windstorms. Western hemlock does not reproduce well on disturbed, exposed soil but germinates under the canopy of Douglas-fir, eventually overtaking the forest by shading out the Douglas-fir, which cannot reproduce in shade. In this zone, despite the high annual precipitation, drought stress in summer is sufficiently severe to limit growth of many species, such as Sitka spruce. Hardwoods such as bigleaf maple, willows, and red alder are limited to disturbed sites and riparian areas. red-cedar grows in the wettest sites. A very small area of the northeastern rain shadow contains the limited Douglas-fir zone, where it is too dry for western hemlock.

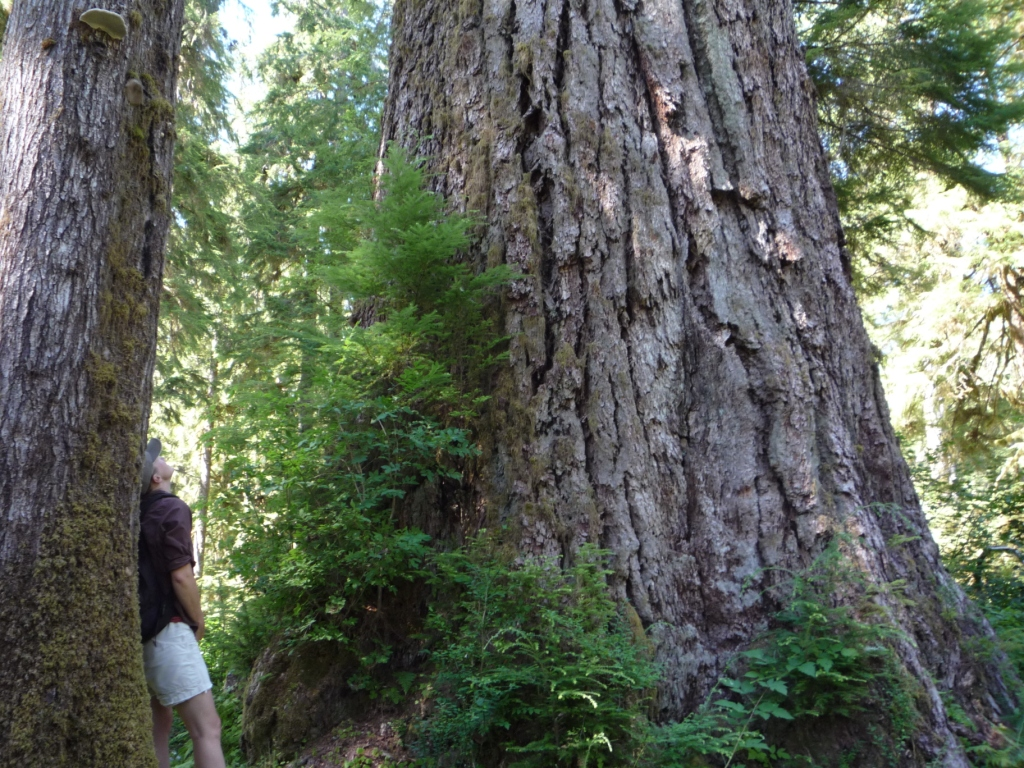
Queets River Douglas-fir

Moving up in elevation and moisture availability is the silver fir zone, up to about 3,900 feet (1,200 m). This zone gets more precipitation, and more of it as snow, than the lower, warmer, drier western hemlock zone. The cold and the snowpack combine to limit growth of lower-elevation plants. On the other hand, silver fir is less drought tolerant and less fire tolerant than either Douglas-fir or western hemlock. Slide alder (Alnus viridis sinuata) grows in snow-creep areas and avalanche chutes, along with yellow-cedar. Meadows of thimbleberry also grow in this zone, often intergrading between the slide alder chutes and the silver fir forest.

The next highest forest zone is the mountain hemlock zone, the highest forest zone in the Olympic mountains. In this zone most precipitation falls as snow and the snow-free growing season is very short. In the drier rainshadow side of the mountains, mountain hemlock is largely replaced by subalpine fir. At the higher elevations of the mountain hemlock/subalpine fir zone, tree cover is reduced to isolated stands of trees called tree islands, surrounded by subalpine meadows, in the subalpine parkland zone. Variations in substrate, topography, moisture, and snowpack depth and duration determine the vegetation community. Tree islands form on convex topography, which tends to gather less snow and shed it sooner than surrounding level or concave topography.

In the west, the subalpine zone is dominated by mountain hemlock. It occurs along with subalpine fir from 1,100 to 1,650 metres (3,610 to 5,410 ft) in the Bailey Range; however, the range of this forest type is not extensive and does not extend much west of Mount Olympus, nor is it common in the east. Chamaecyparis nootkatensis|Yellow-cedar is sometimes found in relation to these plants. In the east and other drier areas, the subalpine zone is dominated by subalpine fir. It can occur with other trees, including mountain hemlock, silver fir, and yellow-cedar, but what characterizes these zones is the dominance of subalpine fir. These forests occur on the eastern ridges from 1,300 to 1,800 metres (4,300 to 5,900 ft).

In the Olympics, the treeline is between 5,000 feet (1,500 m) and 6,000 feet (1,800 m) but can be as low as under 4,000 feet (1,200 m) in some places. Treeline is a function of both elevation and precipitation, particularly the amount of snow that falls each winter. The growing season for trees is relatively short in the higher elevations of the windward Olympics, compared to similar elevations in other mountain ranges, due to the large accumulations of snow that take a long time to melt each year.

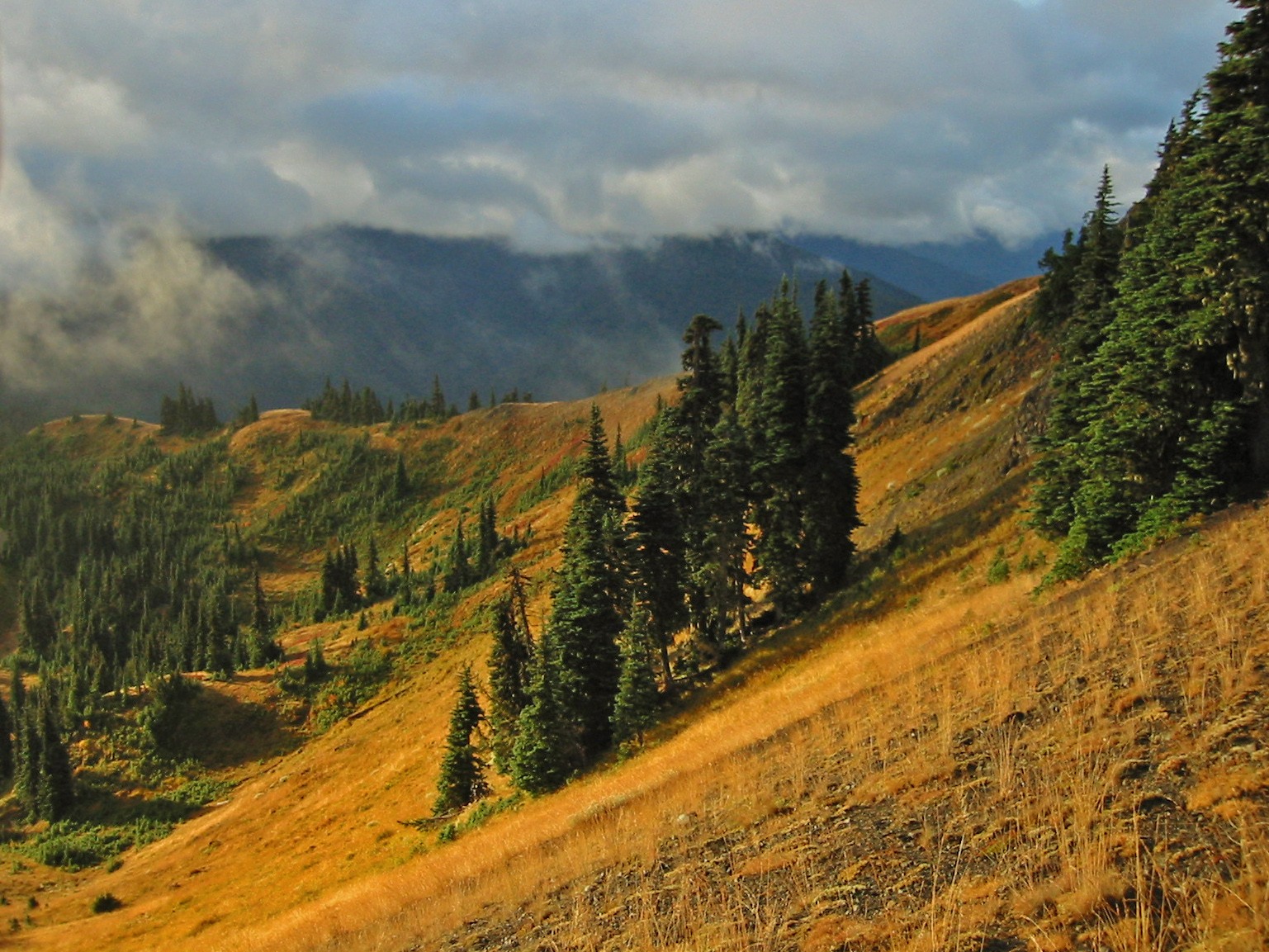
Hurricane Ridge supports dry subalpine and alpine conditions in the Olympics

Subalpine meadows in the Olympic mountains are of 5 types. Heath shrub meadows are dominated by ericaceous huckleberries and heathers. Lush herbaceous meadows are typified by Sitka valerian and showy sedge. Drier areas or those with longer snow cover grow dwarf sedge (Carex nigricans) or grass (Festuca viridis) meadows. Phlox diffusa typifies the low herbaceous meadows of pumice, talus and scree slopes and other rocky areas. American saw-wort is common in both mountain meadows and lower subalpine parklands in the Olympics.

Above timberline is the Alpine zone, not a forest zone since no trees can grow this high. The alpine zone in the Olympics is much more limited in size than in other temperate mountain ranges, from 1,800 metres (5,900 ft) to 2,250 metres (7,380 ft). The high precipitation of the Olympics creates permanent snow and ice at lower elevations than is typical for other mountain ranges, cutting off the alpine vegetation zone. Most of the alpine vegetation is on the rain shadow side, in the northeastern Olympics, where there is less permanent snow and ice. Alpine vegetation is low herbaceous, typified by Phlox diffusa and species of Carex. Many of the Olympic Mountain's endemic plants occur here, such as Piper's bellflower (Campanula piperi) and Olympic violet (Viola flettii).

==== Endemic Plants ====
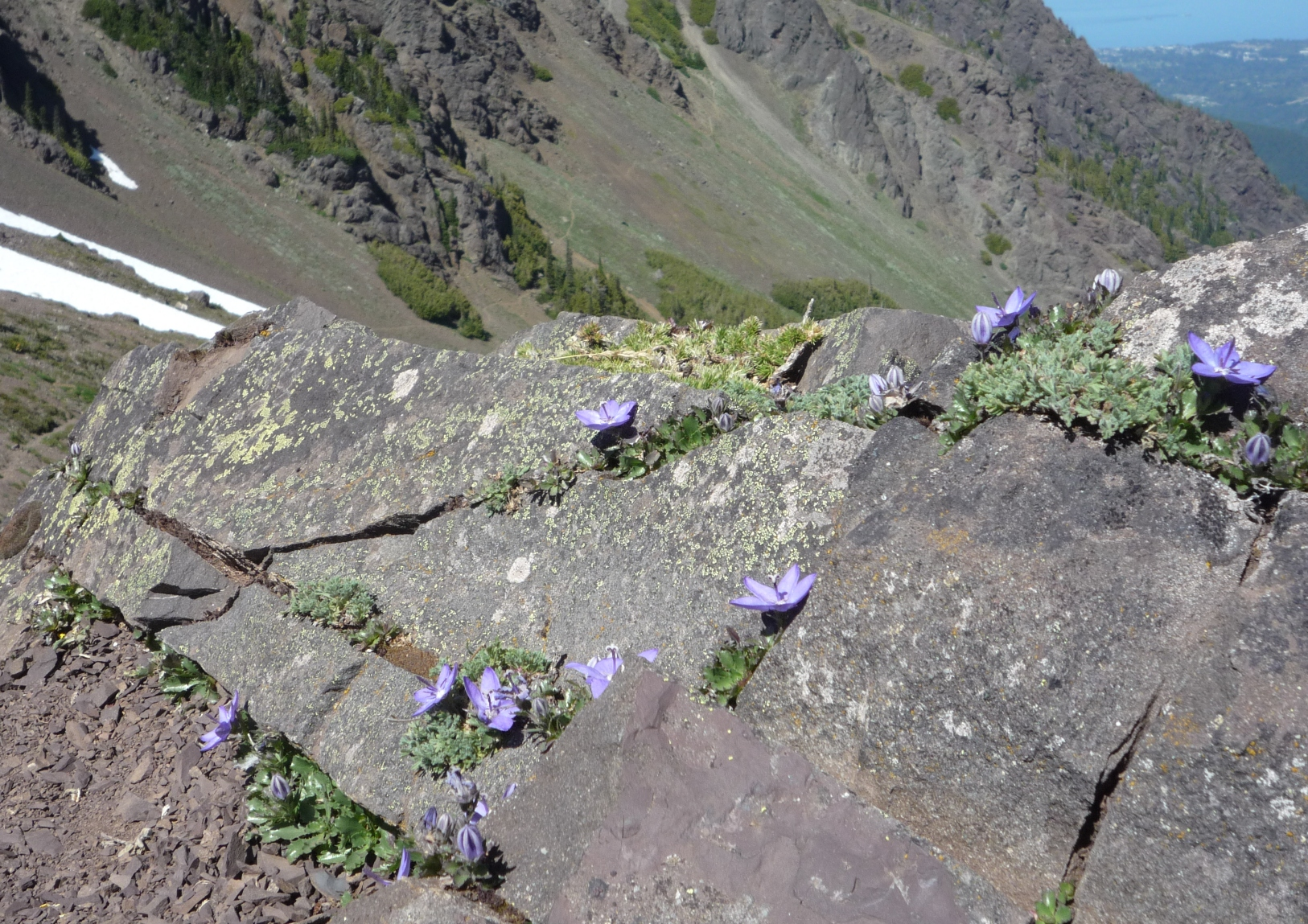
Piper's bellflower, an Olympic Mountain endemic, near Mt. Angeles

- Olympic Mountain milkvetch (Astragalus australis var. olympicus)
- Piper's bellflower (Campanula piperi)
- Spotted coralroot (Corallorhiza maculata var. ozettensis)
- Flett's fleabane (Erigeron flettii)
- Thompson's wandering fleabane (Erigeron peregrinus ssp. peregrinus var. thompsonii)
- Quinault fawn lily (Erythronium quinaultensis)
- Olympic rockmat (Petrophytum hendersonii)
- Olympic Mountain groundsel (Senecio neowebsteri)
- Olympic cut-leaf synthyris (Synthyris pinnatifida var. lanuginosa)
- Olympic Mountain dandelion (Taraxacum olympicum)
- Olympic violet (Viola flettii)

=== Fauna ===
Mammals extirpated from the Olympic Mountains are the fisher (Martes pennanti) and the gray wolf (Canis lupus). The fisher was declared extirpated from Washington State when no fishers were detected during statewide carnivore surveys in the 1990s and 2000s. A reintroduction project was initiated in 2007, in partnership with Olympic National Park. The gray wolf was extirpated from Washington State in the early 20th century. The last wolf documented in the Olympics was trapped in 1920. In the early 21st century, wolves are naturally migrating back into eastern and north-central Washington State, but there is no evidence of wolf migration into the Olympics and no plan to trans-locate wolves to the Olympics.

Carnivores

The gray wolf is listed as endangered by the US Fish and Wildlife Service and the fisher is listed as state endangered by the Washington Fish and Wildlife Commission.

Previous to the extirpation of the gray wolf, coyotes (Canis latrans) occurred in the lowlands of the Olympic peninsula but not in the mountains. With the absence of wolves, coyotes have been moving up into the higher elevations of the mountains and may be responsible for population declines in the Olympic marmot.

American black bear (Ursus americanus) are numerous in the Olympics. Olympic bears eat salmon, rodents, huckleberries, tree bark, insects, and deer or elk carcasses.

Cougar (Felis concolor) is the largest carnivore in the Olympics. Their main prey are deer and elk but they also hunt porcupines and insects. They are rarely seen, but are thought to be widespread and relatively common in the Olympics.

Mountain goats

The mountain goat (Oreamnos americanus) is not native to the Olympic Mountains but was introduced for hunting in the 1920s by a coalition of the Forest Service, the Clallam County Game Warden, and the State Game Commission. Mountain goats in the Olympics have been associated with damage to alpine vegetation and soil erosion.

The goats have also been aggressive towards park visitors. In 1999, a mountain goat gored a hiker at the summit of Mount Ellinor in Olympic National Forest, and in 2010, a mountain goat fatally gored a hiker on the Klahane Ridge trail in Olympic National Park. In 2012, the trail to Mount Ellinor was closed in summer due to aggressive goats, re-opening in the fall.

An airlifting effort by the National Park Service started in September 2018 in an attempt to relocate the goats to the Cascades region. NPS hopes to relocate several hundred goats before starting a lethal removal option. The park service hopes to reduce the goat population to 0–50 animals by 2028.

Elk

Roosevelt elk Cervus canadensis roosevelti range along the Pacific coast from the Russian River to Vancouver Island. Olympic and Vancouver Island elk are some of the last pure Roosevelt elk herds left; those in the Cascades have mixed with Rocky Mountain elk. Olympic National Park has the largest population of Roosevelt elk in the world. Some herds spend winter in lowland valleys, summer in high country, in subalpine meadows. Other herds live year-round in lowland forests and meadows. Elk prefer more humid areas, the Sitka spruce, wet western hemlock, and mountain hemlock zones.

Elk browsing is believed to be responsible for the open park-like structure of the Olympic rainforests; the elk graze on hemlock and shrubs, leaving the Sitka spruce to grow. Elk browsing also increases diversity of grasses and forbs. Elk exclosure experiments in rainforest valleys show more species of vegetation growing outside the exclosures, where elk browse, than inside; while there are more brush and saplings inside exclosures, there are more grasses and forbs outside. Elk browsing improves foraging for other herbivores like deer, voles and snowshoe hares. Elk prefer old growth forest and young alder groves over the large, even-aged plantations common on commercial timber land, although they will use small, recent clearcuts where they mimic natural forest openings.

Both the Press and O'Neil expeditions were impressed by the quantity and tameness of the elk. Both expedition leaders prohibited shooting the elk and deer except when the expedition was in need of meat. The Olympic National Monument was formed to protect the elk after the herds were reduced to less than 2000 animals. The population rebounded, and in 1937 a hunting season for elk was opened in the Hoh River valley.

An estimated 2,000–4,000 hunters came for the 1937 hunting season, several times as many as expected; the excess was a logistical nightmare. One hunter was accidentally shot and died. A second hunter drowned in the Hoh River. A pack horse was shot. The Hoh River flooded, stranding hunters and washing away their camps. Forest Service and State Game personnel were overwhelmed with rescue efforts (lost, stranded, or injured hunters) and dispute resolution. Over 800 elk were killed, some left lying in the forest. Proponents of a national park used the 1937 elk hunt as an argument in favor of permanent protection for Olympic's elk herds. Not all the elk herds are protected inside the national park: Some migrate in and out of the park, and others live entirely outside the park. All elk are subject to regulated hunting when outside the national park.

Mule deer

Blacktail deer (Odocoileus hemionus columbianus) prefer drier areas than elk, such as the dry western hemlock, Douglas-fir, and subalpine fir zones. Similar to the elk, blacktail deer winter in lowlands, or along south-facing ridges, and summer in the high country meadows.

Others

Mountain beaver (Aplodontia rufa) is a large primitive rodent endemic to the Pacific Northwest. They are common in the Olympics, preferring wet scrubby thickets and second growth timber.

Banana slug (Ariolimax columbianus) is another Pacific Northwest endemic. Slugs are abundant in the Olympic forests, outweighing mammals and birds combined. They thrive in the cool damp shade of the forests. The banana slug is the largest and most conspicuous of Olympic slugs.

Northern spotted owl (Strix occidentalis caurina) is an old-growth dependent species and is listed as threatened under the Endangered Species Act. The majority of spotted owls on the Olympic peninsula, along with the largest preserve of temperate old-growth forest, live in the national park. Spotted owls prey on flying squirrels and snowshoe hares, and are themselves preyed on by great horned owls Bubo virginianus. The density of the canopy of an old-growth forest gives the spotted owls some protection from the larger, less agile great horned owls.

Rufous hummingbird (Selasphorus rufus) is the only hummingbird in the Olympics. They overwinter in Mexico and southern California, arriving in the Olympics in February or March with the flowering of the Indian plum Oemleria cerasifera.

Harlequin duck (Histrionicus histrionicus) breeds in fast-moving mountain streams in the Olympics. They spend the rest of the year in coastal waters.

Osprey (Pandion haliaetus) and bald eagle (Haliaeetus leucocephalus) fish in Olympic rivers, nesting in large old trees. Both are relatively common, the bald eagle more so along the coast than in the mountains.

Olympic rivers are dominated by Pacific salmonids, the Oncorhynchus. Chinook, coho, pink, rainbow and steelhead, and cutthroat all spawn in Olympic rivers. Chum and sockeye also live in coastal Olympic peninsula rivers but do not reach into the mountains. Bull trout (Salvelinus confluentus) and Dolly Varden trout (S. malma) also live in Olympic rivers.

==== Endemic fauna ====
There are at least 16 endemic animal species.

Mammals

- Olympic marmot (Marmota olympus)
- Olympic chipmunk (Neotamias amoenus caurinus)
- Olympic snow mole (Scapanus townsendii olympicus)
- Mazama pocket gopher (Thomomys mazama melanops)
- Olympic ermine (Mustela richardsonii olympica)

Amphibians

- Olympic torrent salamander (Rhyacotriton olympicus)

Fish

- Olympic mudminnow (Novumbra hubbsi)
- Beardslee rainbow trout (Oncorhynchus mykiss irideus)
- Crescenti cutthroat trout (Oncorhynchus clarki clarki)

Insects

- Hulbert's skipper butterfly (Hesperia comma hulbirti)
- Olympic grasshopper (Nisquallia olympica)
- Mann's gazelle beetle (Nebria dammanni)
- Quileute gazelle beetle (Nebria acuta quileute)
- Tiger beetle (Cicindela bellissima frechini)

Molluscs

- Arionid slug (Hemphillia dromedarius)
- Arionid jumping slug (Hemphillia burringtoni)

Near-endemic

Near-endemics, those that occur in the Olympics as well as other parts of a limited range, include the Cope's giant salamander (Dicamptodon copei), and the Van Dyke's salamander (Plethodon vandykei,) both found primarily in the Olympics and other mountainous areas of western Washington; the tailed frog (Ascaphus truei), of Pacific Northwest mountain streams, and the mountain beaver (Aplodontia rufa) of the coastal Pacific Northwest.

== History ==
For the original inhabitants of the Olympic Peninsula, the highest peaks of the mountains were the only refuges during the Great Floods at the beginning of time. For the Elwha Klallam people, that peak was Mount Carrie; for the Skokomish, it was a peak west of Mount Ellinor. The Thunderbird figure of the Hoh tribe lived on Mount Olympus, in a den under Blue Glacier. People in the Skokomish, Quinault, and Elwha watersheds regularly traveled into the high country to hunt elk, gather huckleberries and beargrass, and perform spirit quests. Trails across the mountains allowed members of the various tribes to visit and trade with each other. The cross-Olympic expeditions of the 1890s found tree blazes that they took to mark Indian trails.

Archeological evidence shows that the Olympic Mountains were inhabited by Paleolithic hunters after the retreat of the Cordilleran Ice Sheet. Stone tools in the Deer Park area date to 7600 years ago, prior to the volcanic eruption of Mount Mazama. Similar tools have been found near Lake Cushman and throughout the Olympic subalpine meadows and ridges, as well as in coastal areas. In addition, a fragment of a woven basket found in the Olympic subalpine of Obstruction Point was radiocarbon dated to nearly 3000 years ago.

The mountains were originally called "Sun-a-do" by the Duwamish Indians, while the first European to see them, the Spanish navigator Juan Pérez, named Mount Olympus "Santa Rosalia", in 1774. But the English captain John Meares, seeing them in 1788, thought he would honor the Greek explorer Juan de Fuca who claimed to have found the fabled Northwest passage nearby by naming the mountain after the mythical home of Greek gods which is "Mount Olympus" in Greece. Various names for the mountains were used based on the name Mount Olympus, including the Olympic Range, the Olympian Mountains, and the Olympus Range. Alternate proposals never caught on, and in 1864 the Seattle Weekly Gazette persuaded the government to make the present-day name official, although other names continued to be used.

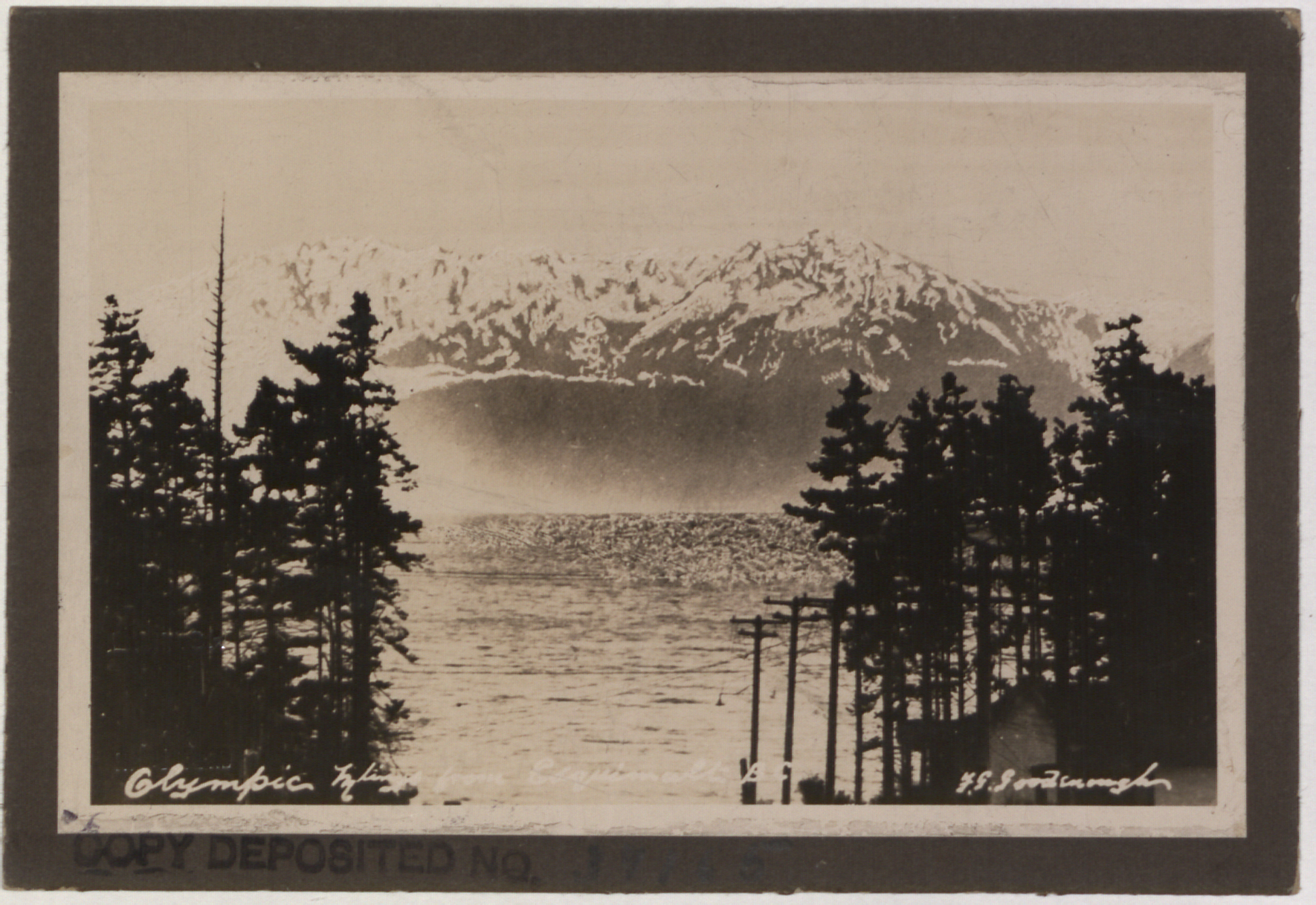
Olympic Mountains from Esquimalt, BC, 1921, F.G. Goodenough photographer

=== First O'Neil Expedition, 1885 ===
Though readily visible from many parts of western Washington, especially Seattle, the interior was almost entirely unexplored until 1885, when 2nd Lt. Joseph P. O'Neil of the 14th Infantry, stationed at Fort Vancouver, led a small expedition into the northern Olympics from Port Angeles. O'Neil led an expedition of 3 enlisted men, 2 civilian engineers, and 8 mules out of Port Angeles in July 1885. The expedition cut a mule trail from Port Angeles up to Hurricane Ridge and camped near the current site of the national park visitor center. From there, they explored and built trail to the east and south, exploring the upper Dungeness and Dosewallips River watersheds, and to Cameron Basin near Mount Cameron. O'Neil was recalled by the Army in August to be transferred to Fort Leavenworth in Kansas, and the expedition had to return to Fort Townsend. The Obstruction Peak Road and portions of the Hurricane Ridge Road and the Klahane Ridge, Grand Pass and Lost Pass trails in Olympic National Park originated with the mule trails built by this expedition.

In late 1889, Charles A. Gilman and his son Samuel explored the East Fork Quinault up to its headwaters, but chose to return the way they came rather than cross over the mountains.

=== Press Expedition 1889–1890 ===
The first crossing of the Olympic Mountains was done from November 1889 through May 1890 by the Press Expedition, a group of 5 men led by Canadian James H. Christie, sponsored by the Seattle newspaper Press, which ascended the Elwha River and descended the North Fork Quinault River. The Press party included 2 mules, which both died in separate incidents, and 4 dogs, 1 of which was killed by an elk.

The Press Expedition crossed in winter, in order to beat O'Neil's planned expedition for the summer of 1890. Initially the expedition built a boat on the Elwha to tow their cargo upriver, but the icy water and deep snow covering boulders and fallen trees made this mode of transportation very slow – after 2 weeks, the men had towed the boat 4 miles (6.4 km). It did, however, carry cargo where the mules could not. Christie and his men abandoned the boat and switched to the mules when they reached the head of navigation on the Elwha, but the mules both died in separate incidents fairly early in the expedition. Deep snow, steep slopes, and fallen trees made travel extremely difficult for the mules, along with lack of forage.

The expedition carried minimal food, expecting to find game. In the lowlands, game and fish were plentiful, but the heavy snow that winter drove game out of the mountains and for long stretches in the high mountains, the men were reduced to eating 'flour soup'. Unlike O'Neil's military expeditions, the Press Expedition had no resupply line. Once into the high mountains and the deep snow, with no game, they went weeks with no meat and little to eat besides flour and beans. The men carried all the cargo on their own backs through one of the roughest and most labyrinthine sections of the high mountains, through snow 10 to 15 feet (3.0 to 4.6 m) deep.

On climbing a peak to get a view of the area, Christie estimated the snow at the peak to be 25 feet (7.6 m) deep. Avalanches occurred on a daily basis. Crossing Low Divide between the upper Elwha and the headwaters of the North Fork Quinault, the men climbed a vertical cliff, requiring Christie to climb to a ledge and then lower a rope to the men below. Packs, dogs, and men were hauled up the cliff by rope. Once on the Quinault side of the divide, the men shot and ate a bear, the first meat they had had for several weeks of strenuous winter mountain travel.

Deep snow prevented proper trail building for much of their route, although they did cut a rough trail along the lower reach of the Elwha River, and blazed trees along their route. They used elk trails wherever possible, and walked in the river when there was no other way through due to steep terrain or dense brush. It took the expedition four months of slogging through dense brush and windthrows, swamps, steep canyons and deep, wet, slushy snow just to reach the inner mountains. Once in the high mountains, the relief was so precipitous that the men estimated they traveled up and down as much as 6 miles (9.7 km) to cover 2 miles (3.2 km) horizontal miles.

Once on the mainstem Quinault River, the men built a raft, but it wrecked on a logjam. The men saved the dogs and the one pack that contained their maps, photographs, and records made along the route, but lost all their food, armaments, utensils, fishing tackle, shelter, and the few mineral and plant specimens and animal skins they had collected; and the men were split on opposite sides of the river, unable to reach each other. They continued walking down the river, eating salmonberry shoots and spruce bark, until a settler and a Quinault Indian guide canoeing to Lake Quinault rescued them. When the O'Neil expedition of 1890 reached the mainstem Quinault River a few months later, they found some of the items the Press Expedition had lost in the wreck. The settler and neighboring Indians took the expedition across Lake Quinault and down the lower river to the coast in mid May, nearly six months after they left Port Angeles. From the mouth of the Quinault they traveled to Aberdeen and then to Seattle. Their account of their expedition, along with photographs and a full-page map, was printed in a special edition of the Press on 16 July 1890.

The Elwha River and North Fork Quinault trails in Olympic National Park follow the route of the Press Expedition, with a detour through the highest mountains and around the vertical cliff at Low Divide.

=== Second O'Neil Expedition, 1890 ===
O'Neil returned to Washington in 1887 and started planning another expedition. The Olympic Exploring Expedition, led by O'Neil, crossed the southern Olympics in the summer of 1890, ascending the North Fork Skokomish River and descending the East Fork Quinault River, building a mule trail the entire distance. This expedition was larger than the 1885 expedition, and would be resupplied by mule train from Hoodsport on Hood Canal, allowing time for scientific exploration of the area. The expedition consisted of 10 soldiers, 1 civilian mule packer, 4 civilian scientists from the Oregon Alpine Club, 11 mules, 1 bell mare to lead the mule train, and up to 4 dogs. The scientists collected specimens of plants, animals, and minerals, which they shipped back to Portland by way of the mule train to Hoodsport. The majority of the party was assigned to cutting the mule trail, while 2 or 3 man exploring parties fanned out and scouts went ahead. The scouts and side exploring parties scrambled up slopes on all fours, pulling themselves up by grabbing onto vegetation; descended similar slopes by sliding, deliberately or inadvertently; hacked and crawled through dense brush and windthrow; waded up rivers and streams when there was no other way through; felled trees to bridge ravines and rivers; and traversed narrow ridges of crumbling vertically oriented shale. Hornet and yellow jacket wasp attacks were a daily occurrence, sending men scrambling and mules stampeding, one over a cliff to her death. Where the men crossed swamps, devils club thorns impaled the men and broke off in their skin, creating painful inflammations.

Once camped in the central mountains, O'Neil sent out small exploring parties to the Duckabush, Dosewallips, South Fork Skokomish, Wynoochee and Humptulips rivers, and to Mount Olympus and the Queets River. One party of 3 men climbed what they thought was Mount Olympus but was in reality one of the neighboring peaks, Athena II. A fourth member of the summit party became separated on the climb and ended up descending the Queets River alone, and was taken in by a Quinault Indian family. They were reluctant to believe that he had crossed the Olympics, not believing it was possible to do so; but they accepted his story when he was able to point out reference points on a map. (Many members of this expedition spoke Chinook jargon.) From their settlement, he was able to rejoin the expedition in Hoquiam. O'Neil's reports on his explorations resulted in his recommendation that the region be declared a national park.

=== 20th century ===
Mount Olympus itself was not ascended until 1907, one of the first successes of The Mountaineers, which had been organized in Seattle just a few years earlier. A number of the more obscure and least-accessible peaks in the range were not ascended until the 1970s.

President Grover Cleveland protected the forests of the Olympic Peninsula with the Olympic Forest Reserve in 1897. Initially the reserve consisted of over 2,000,000 acres (810,000 ha), nearly the entire peninsula. Forest Service surveyors Dodwell and Rixon spent three years surveying, timber cruising, and mapping the new reserve. Their report, published in 1902, reported that most of the land was not suited to agriculture, but local politicians had already convinced President William McKinley to remove the most valuable lowland timber from the reserve, claiming it should be open to homesteading. Private timber companies paid 'homesteaders' to file claims on land that they then sold to the timber company. At the same time, commercial hunters reduced the Olympic elk herds to fewer than 2000 animals, prompting the state legislature to impose a temporary moratorium on elk hunting in the Olympics. The Forest Reserve was reorganized under Gifford Pinchot as the Olympic National Forest in 1905, with an emphasis on commercial utilization of timber and minerals and fire protection, as well as hunting and trapping. With the passing of the Antiquities Act in 1906, which allowed the president to designate national monuments, Mount Olympus National Monument, administered by the Forest Service, was proclaimed by Theodore Roosevelt in 1909 in order to protect the elk herds. In 1914, the new supervisor of the Forest Service, Henry Graves, made a trip to the Olympics to determine if commercial timber and minerals were being tied up in the national monument. As a result of Graves's report, President Woodrow Wilson removed a third of a 1,000,000 acres (400,000 ha) from the monument.

The Elwha River was dammed in 1910 with construction of the Elwha Dam. A second dam was built a few miles upstream in 1927. Neither dam had any fish passage for the salmonid runs, eliminating salmonids from over 70 miles (110 km) of river. Congress authorized removal of these dams in 1992, and work began in 2011.

The North Fork Skokomish River was dammed in the 1920s by the city of Tacoma, enlarging the original Lake Cushman by 600%. A settlement was reached in 2009 with the Skokomish Indian Tribe over damages to fisheries and game habitat, damages to tribal lands through flooding, and trespass on tribal lands for the power transmission line. As part of the settlement, migrating salmon will be trucked around the dam.

The Wynoochee River was dammed in the late 1960s by the Army Corps of Engineers for flood control, but in 1994 the dam was taken over by the city of Tacoma for power generation. Migrating salmon are trucked around the dam, and Tacoma Public Utilities funds mitigation for Roosevelt elk wintering habitat that was lost under the reservoir.

With the building of the Spruce Railroad during World War I and the completion of the Olympic Highway in 1931, logging in the Olympics intensified, along with demand for recreational facilities. During this period the Forest Service built roads and campgrounds and encouraged private businesses with special use permits to build tourist facilities such as a winter sports facility at Deer Park and the chalets in Enchanted Valley and at Low Divide. Special use permits were also issued for private summer cabins at Lakes Cushman and Quinault, and the Olympic Hot Springs resort. During the Great Depression, the Olympic National Forest used the Civilian Conservation Corps to build logging roads and railroads, bridges, campgrounds, shelters, fire lookouts, ranger stations, and a fish hatchery. They also fought fires and planted tree seedlings.

Pressure for a national park built with the acceleration of logging and road building. The Forest Service campaigned in peninsula logging and mill towns against the national park, and both the Forest Service and the Park Service jockeyed for public support and endorsement from various conservation groups for administration of the monument. In 1935, a special committee was convened on the national park proposal. The majority reported that the Olympics fully rated protection as a national park, but one member issued a minority report stating that public pressure for recreational facilities would require the Park Service to build roads, campgrounds, and chalets, thus negating any benefit from national park status. Both the Forest Service and the Park Service sponsored backcountry trips through the high Olympics that summer to promote their stewardship of the mountains.

In 1937, President Franklin D. Roosevelt visited the Olympics to determine their suitability as a national park, and was greeted in Port Angeles by more than 3000 local school children asking him to 'give us our Olympic National Park'. He signed Olympic National Park into law in 1938. In 1953, the park was enlarged with the addition of the coastal strip, and more coastal areas along Lake Ozette were added in 1976. Also that year, UNESCO named the park an International Biosphere Reserve, and a World Heritage Site in 1981. In 1984, Congress designated 5 wilderness areas in the Olympic National Forest, and declared 95% of Olympic National Park a wilderness area in 1988.
