= Duckabush =

Duckabush may refer to:

- Duckabush, Washington
- Mount Duckabush in Washington state
- Duckabush River, which runs near the mountain
