= White Mountain (Olympic Mountains) =

Mountain in Washington (state), United States

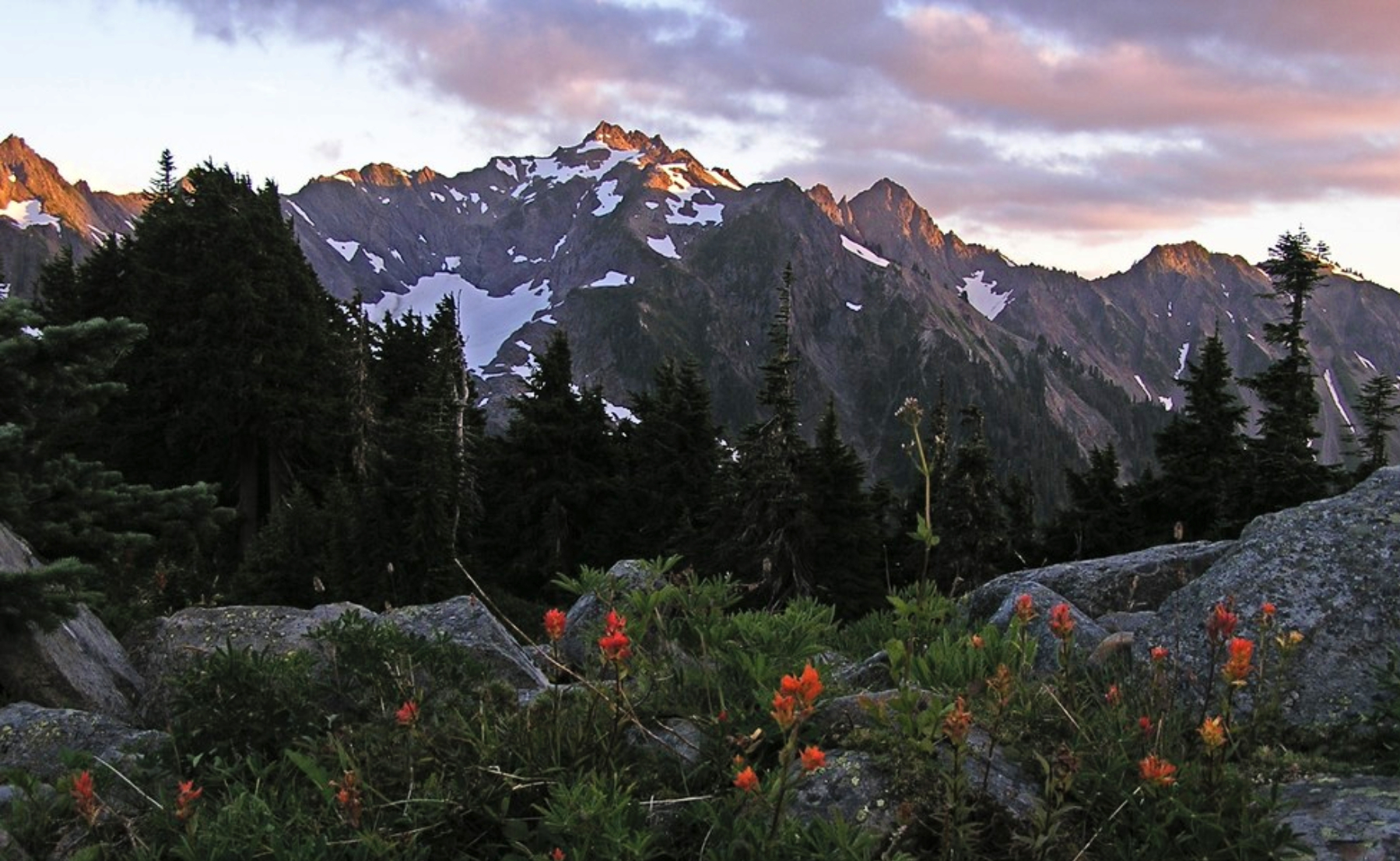
- White Mountain

Highest point
- Elevation: 6,378 ft (1,944 m)
- Prominence: 520 ft (160 m)
- Parent peak: Mount LaCrosse (6,417 ft)
- Isolation: 0.95 mi (1.53 km)
- Coordinates: 47°40′36″N 123°19′43″W

Geography
- Location within Washington (state) Location within the United States
- Country: United States
- State: Washington
- County: Jefferson
- Protected area: Olympic National Park
- Parent range: Olympic Mountains
- Topo map: USGS Mount Steel

Geology
- Rock age: Eocene

Climbing
- Easiest route: class 2 scrambling

White Mountain is a 6,378-foot (1,944-metre) mountain summit located in the Olympic Mountains, in Jefferson County of Washington state. Situated in Olympic National Park, its nearest higher neighbor is Mount LaCrosse, 0.95 mi (1.53 km) to the northeast, and an unnamed glacier lies in the north cirque between the two peaks. The Anderson massif lies 3.1 mi (5.0 km) to the north of White Mountain. Precipitation runoff from the mountain drains into tributaries of the Quinault River and Duckabush River.

== Climate ==
Based on the Köppen climate classification, White Mountain is located in the marine west coast climate zone of western North America. Weather fronts originating in the Pacific Ocean travel northeast toward the Olympic Mountains. As fronts approach, they are forced upward by the peaks (orographic lift), causing them to drop their moisture in the form of rain or snow. As a result, the Olympics experience high precipitation, especially during the winter months in the form of snowfall. Because of maritime influence, snow tends to be wet and heavy, resulting in avalanche danger. During winter months weather is usually cloudy, but due to high pressure systems over the Pacific Ocean that intensify during summer months, there is often little or no cloud cover during the summer. The months of July through September offer the most favorable weather for climbing.

== Geology ==
The Olympic Mountains are composed of obducted clastic wedge material and oceanic crust, primarily Eocene sandstone, turbidite, and basaltic oceanic crust. The mountains were sculpted during the Pleistocene era by erosion and glaciers advancing and retreating multiple times.

== Gallery ==
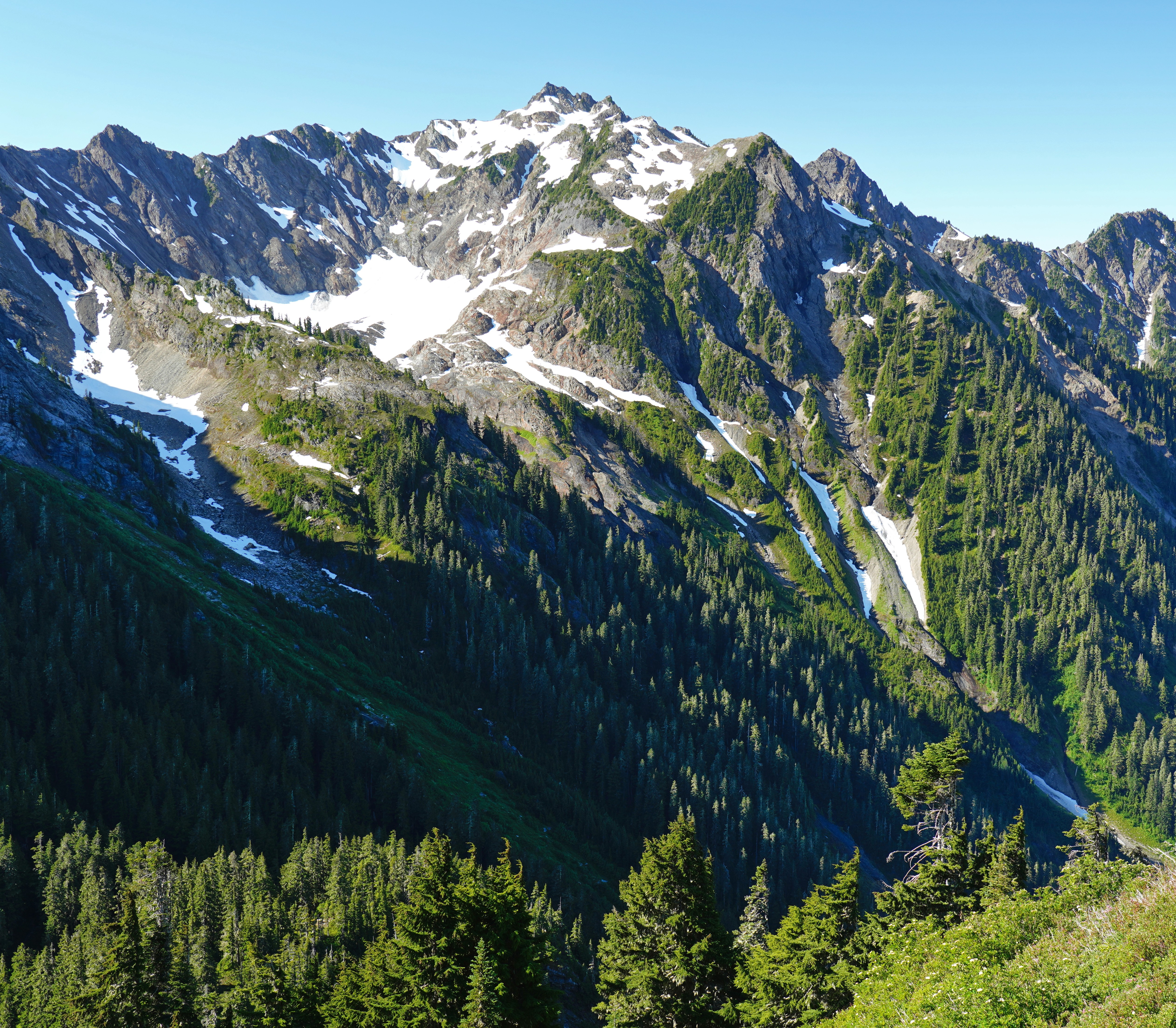
White Mountain

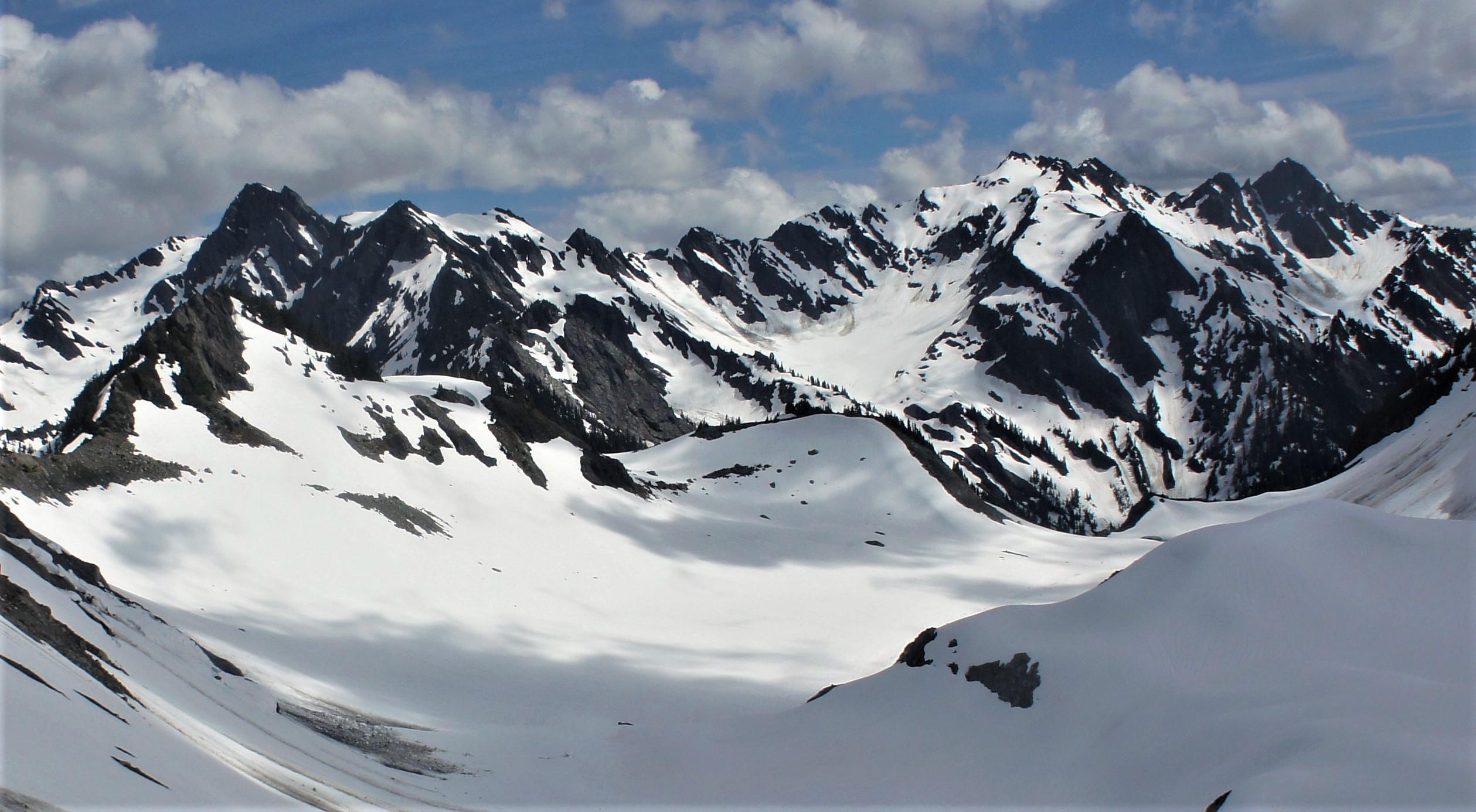
Mt. La Crosse (left) and White Mountain (right) from the north

== See also ==
- Olympic Mountains
- Geology of the Pacific Northwest
- Geography of Washington (state)
