= Mount LaCrosse =

Mountain in Washington (state), United States

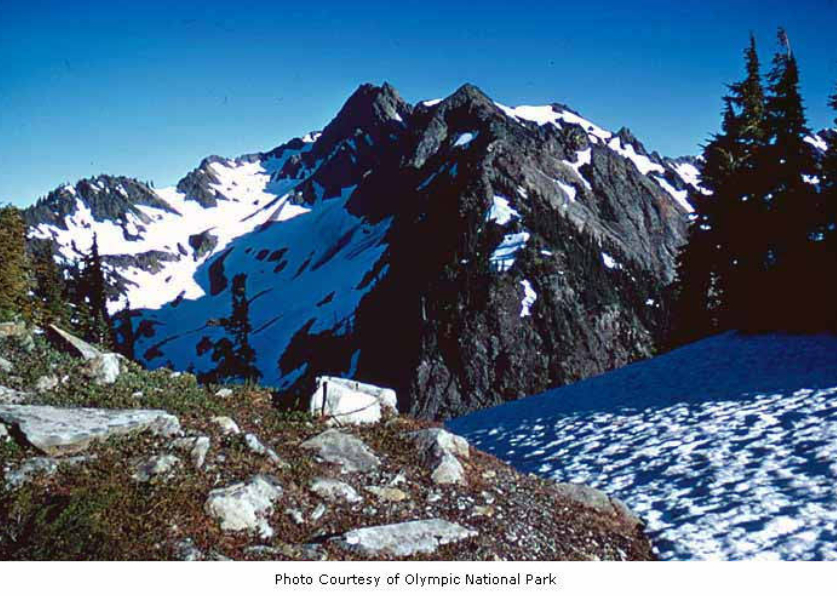

Highest point
- Elevation: 6,417 ft (1,956 m)
- Prominence: 977 ft (298 m)
- Parent peak: Mount Elk Lick
- Isolation: 2.54 mi (4.09 km)
- Coordinates: 47°41′05″N 123°18′44″W

Geography
- Location within Washington (state) Location within the United States
- Country: United States
- State: Washington
- County: Jefferson
- Protected area: Olympic National Park
- Parent range: Olympic Mountains
- Topo map: USGS Mount Steel

Geology
- Rock age: Eocene
- Rock type: Basalt

Climbing
- First ascent: 1928 Richard Paulson, William Ryer, Paul Wiseman, Frank Woodworth
- Easiest route: Scrambling Class 2

Mount LaCrosse, is a 6,417-foot (1,956-metre) mountain summit in the Olympic Mountains and is located in Jefferson County of Washington state. It is situated in Olympic National Park and the nearest higher peak is Mount Elk Lick, 2.54 mi (4.09 km) to the east. The Anderson massif lies 2.67 mi (4.30 km) to the north of Mount LaCrosse, and White Mountain lies 0.95 mi (1.53 km) to the southwest. Precipitation runoff from the mountain drains into tributaries of the Dosewallips River and Duckabush River.

== History ==
The peak's toponym derives from the nearby lake with the same name, Lake LaCrosse. Members of the 1890 O'Neil Expedition named the body of water "Lake of the Holy Cross" because of a large tree with branches and trunk in the shape of a cross guarded the lake. Over the subsequent years the name transformed to "Lake of the Cross" and eventually to its present-day name. It is officially spelled as Mount LaCrosse.

The first ascent of the mountain was made in 1928 by Richard Paulson, William Ryer, Paul Wiseman, and Frank Woodworth.

== Climate ==
Based on the Köppen climate classification, Mount LaCrosse is located in the marine west coast climate zone of western North America. Weather fronts originating in the Pacific Ocean travel northeast toward the Olympic Mountains. As fronts approach, they are forced upward by the peaks (orographic lift), causing them to drop their moisture in the form of rain or snow. As a result, the Olympics experience high precipitation, especially during the winter months in the form of snowfall. Because of maritime influence, snow tends to be wet and heavy, resulting in avalanche danger. During winter months weather is usually cloudy, but due to high pressure systems over the Pacific Ocean that intensify during summer months, there is often little or no cloud cover during the summer. In terms of favorable weather, June to September are the best months for climbing the mountain.

== Geology ==
The Olympic Mountains are composed of obducted clastic wedge material and oceanic crust, primarily Eocene sandstone, turbidite, and basaltic oceanic crust. The mountains were sculpted during the Pleistocene era by erosion and glaciers advancing and retreating multiple times.

== Gallery ==
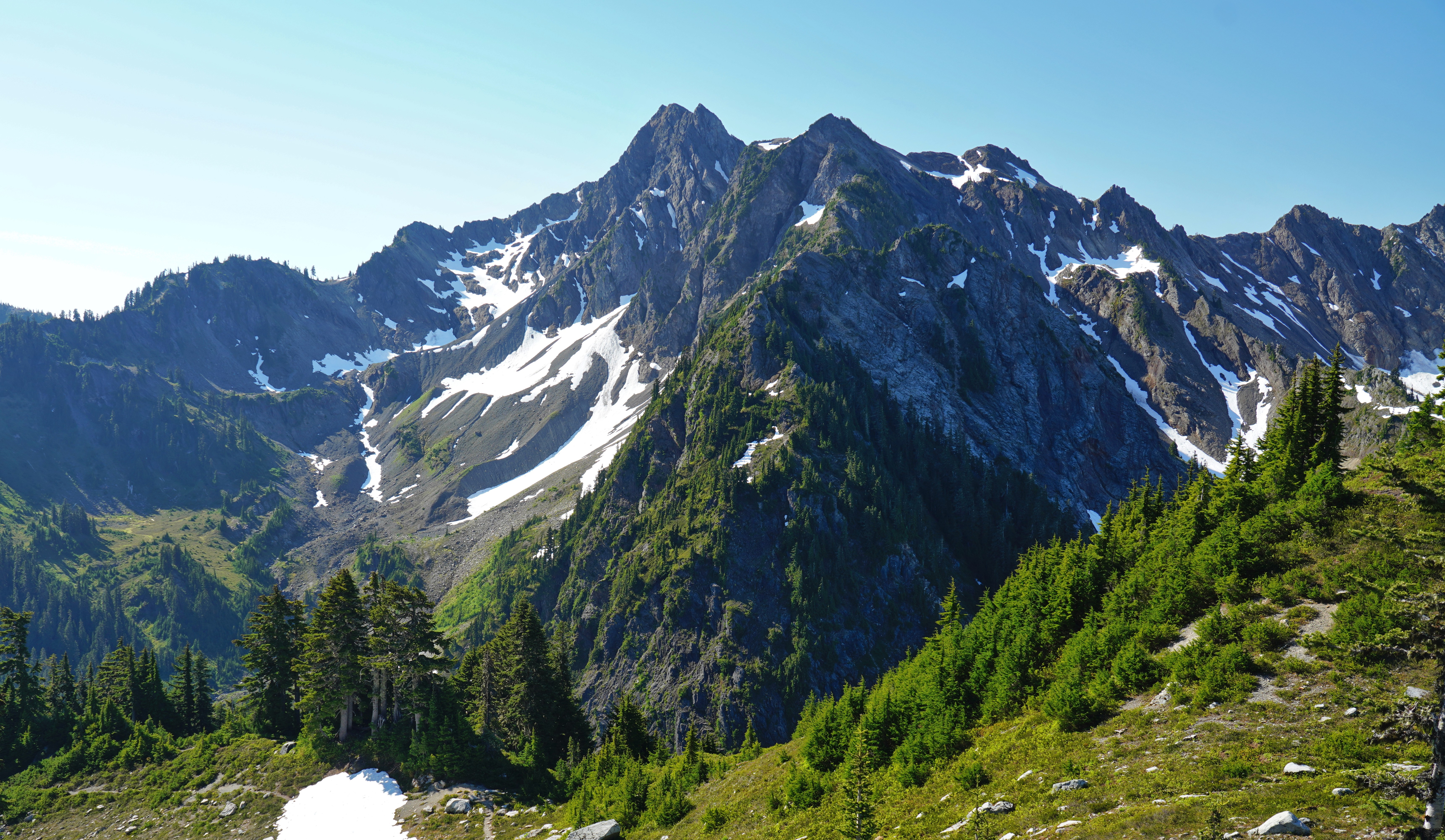

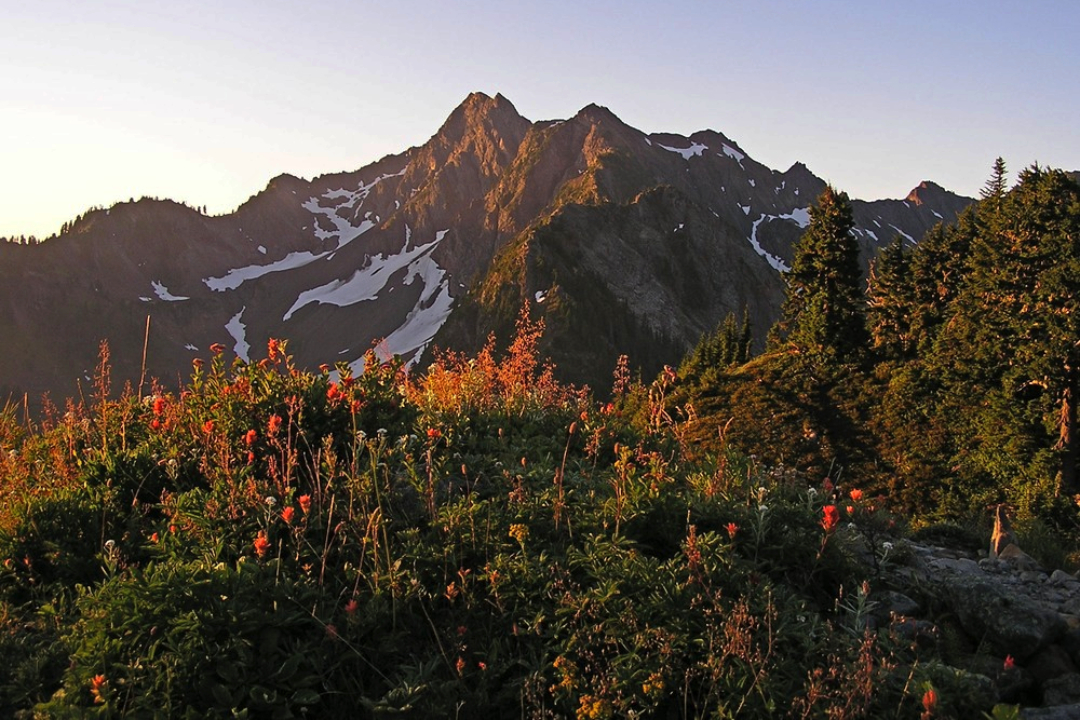
Mount LaCrosse in morning light

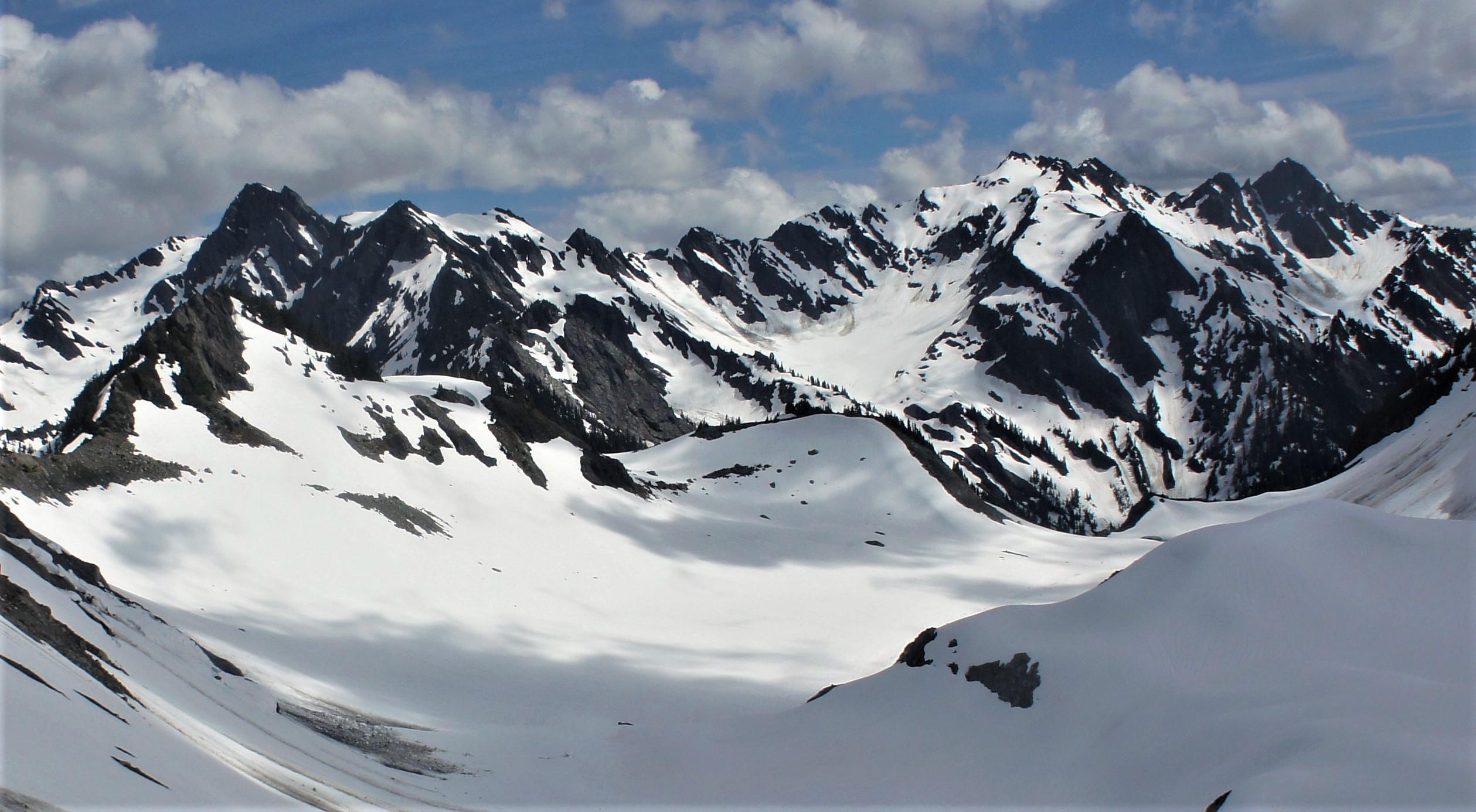
Mt. La Crosse (left) and White Mountain (right) from the north

== See also ==
- Olympic Mountains
- Geology of the Pacific Northwest
