= O'Neil Peak =

Mountain in Washington (state), United States

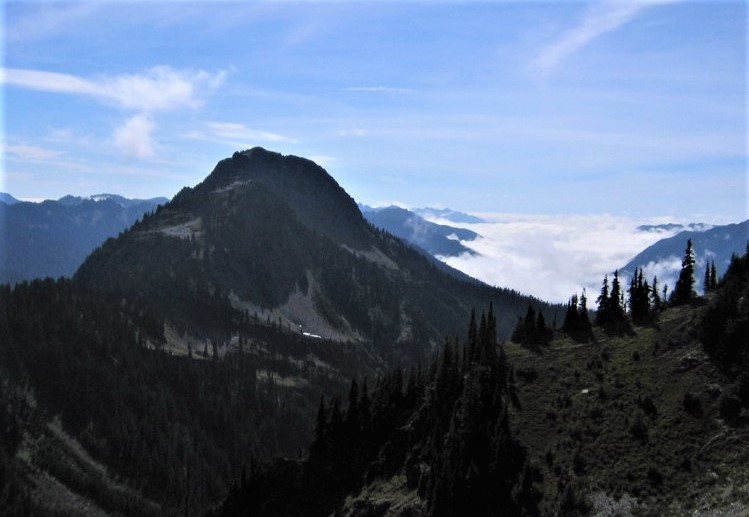
- Northeast aspect, from O'Neil Pass

Highest point
- Elevation: 5,758 ft (1,755 m)
- Prominence: 918 ft (280 m)
- Parent peak: Mount Duckabush (6,254 ft)
- Isolation: 1.85 mi (2.98 km)
- Coordinates: 47°37′32″N 123°23′46″W

Geography
- Location within Washington (state) Location within the United States
- Country: United States
- State: Washington
- County: Jefferson
- Protected area: Olympic National Park
- Parent range: Olympic Mountains
- Topo map: USGS Chimney Peak

Geology
- Rock age: Eocene

Climbing
- Easiest route: class 3 scrambling via O'Neil Pass

O'Neil Peak is a 5,758-foot-elevation (1,755-meter) mountain summit located in the Olympic Mountains, in Jefferson County of Washington state. It is situated in Olympic National Park and the Daniel J. Evans Wilderness. The nearest higher neighbor is Mount Duckabush, 1.6 mi (2.6 km) to the east-northeast, and O'Neil Pass lies 1.5-mile to the northeast. Precipitation runoff from the mountain drains into tributaries of the Quinault River. Topographic relief is significant as the summit rises over 4,300 feet (1,300 m) above the Quinault River in approximately 1.5-mile, and 2,700 feet (820 m) above O'Neil Creek in one-half-mile.

== Climate ==
O'Neil Peak is located in the marine west coast climate zone of western North America. Most weather fronts originate in the Pacific Ocean, and travel east toward the Olympic Mountains. As fronts approach, they are forced upward by the peaks of the Olympic Range, causing them to drop their moisture in the form of rain or snowfall (Orographic lift). As a result, the Olympics experience high precipitation, especially during the winter months. Because of maritime influence, snow tends to be wet and heavy, resulting in avalanche danger. During winter months, weather is usually cloudy, but due to high pressure systems over the Pacific Ocean that intensify during summer months, there is often little or no cloud cover during the summer. The months June through October offer the most favorable weather for climbing or viewing this peak.

== History ==
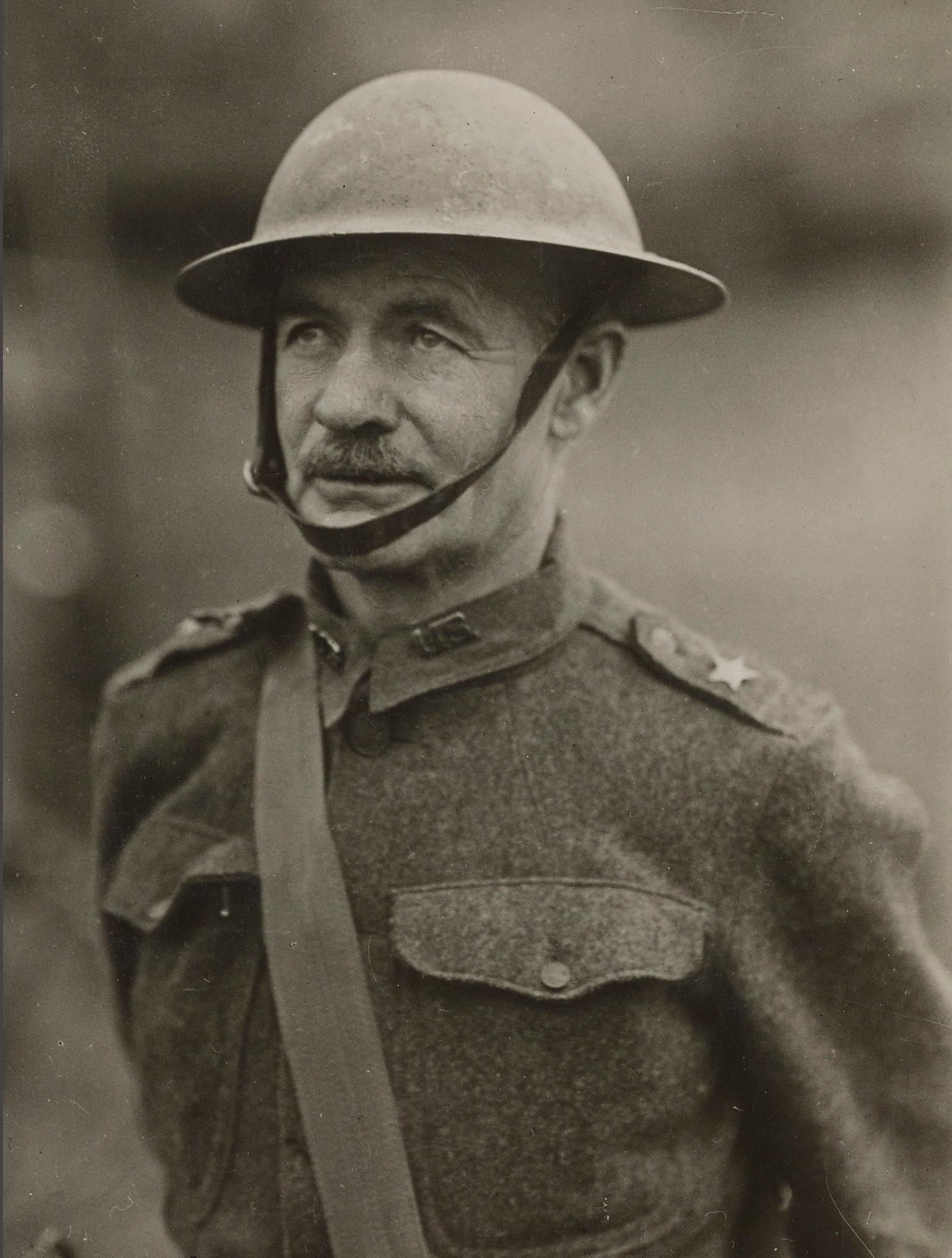
O'Neil in 1918

The mountain's name has been officially adopted by the U.S. Board on Geographic Names. It honors Lieutenant Joseph P. O'Neil (1863–1938), United States Army officer who led the 1885 and 1890 O'Neil Expeditions to explore the interior of the Olympic Mountains. Traveling east to west, his second exploratory party of 1890 traveled up the North Fork Skokomish River, circled around the north side of Mount Steel to O'Neil Pass, then descended into Enchanted Valley and followed the Quinault River to Lake Quinault. Sometime during or immediately after the second expedition, the mountain was christened after him. The volume of work accomplished by O'Neil and his team expanded the body of knowledge about the interior of the Olympic Peninsula, and sections of the route that they blazed are now part of the park's trail system.

== Geology ==
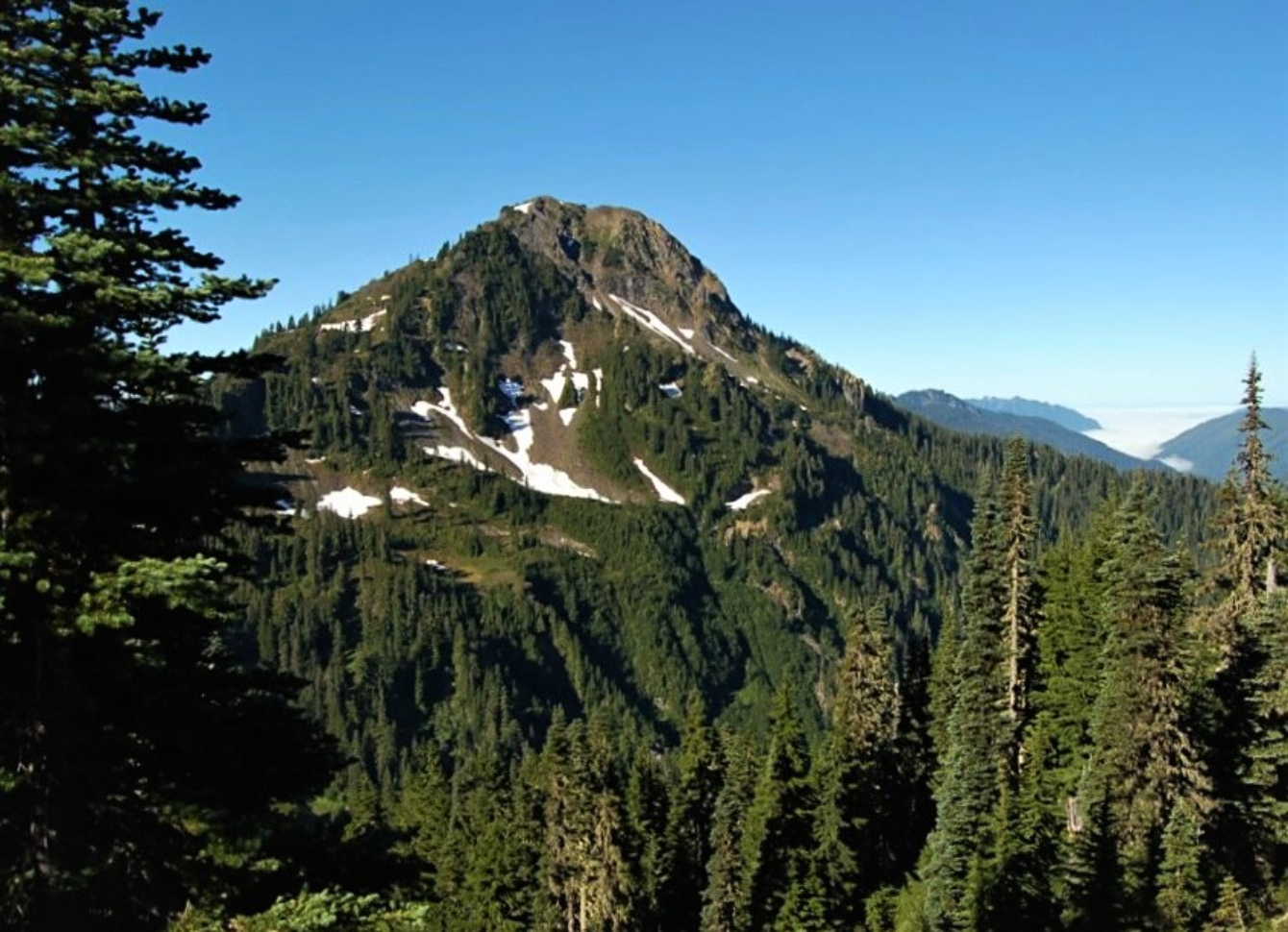
O'Neil Peak

The Olympic Mountains are composed of obducted clastic wedge material and oceanic crust, primarily Eocene sandstone, turbidite, and basaltic oceanic crust. The mountains were sculpted during the Pleistocene era by erosion and glaciers advancing and retreating multiple times.

== See also ==
- Geology of the Pacific Northwest
- Olympic Mountains
