= Mount Elk Lick =

Mountain in Washington (state), United States

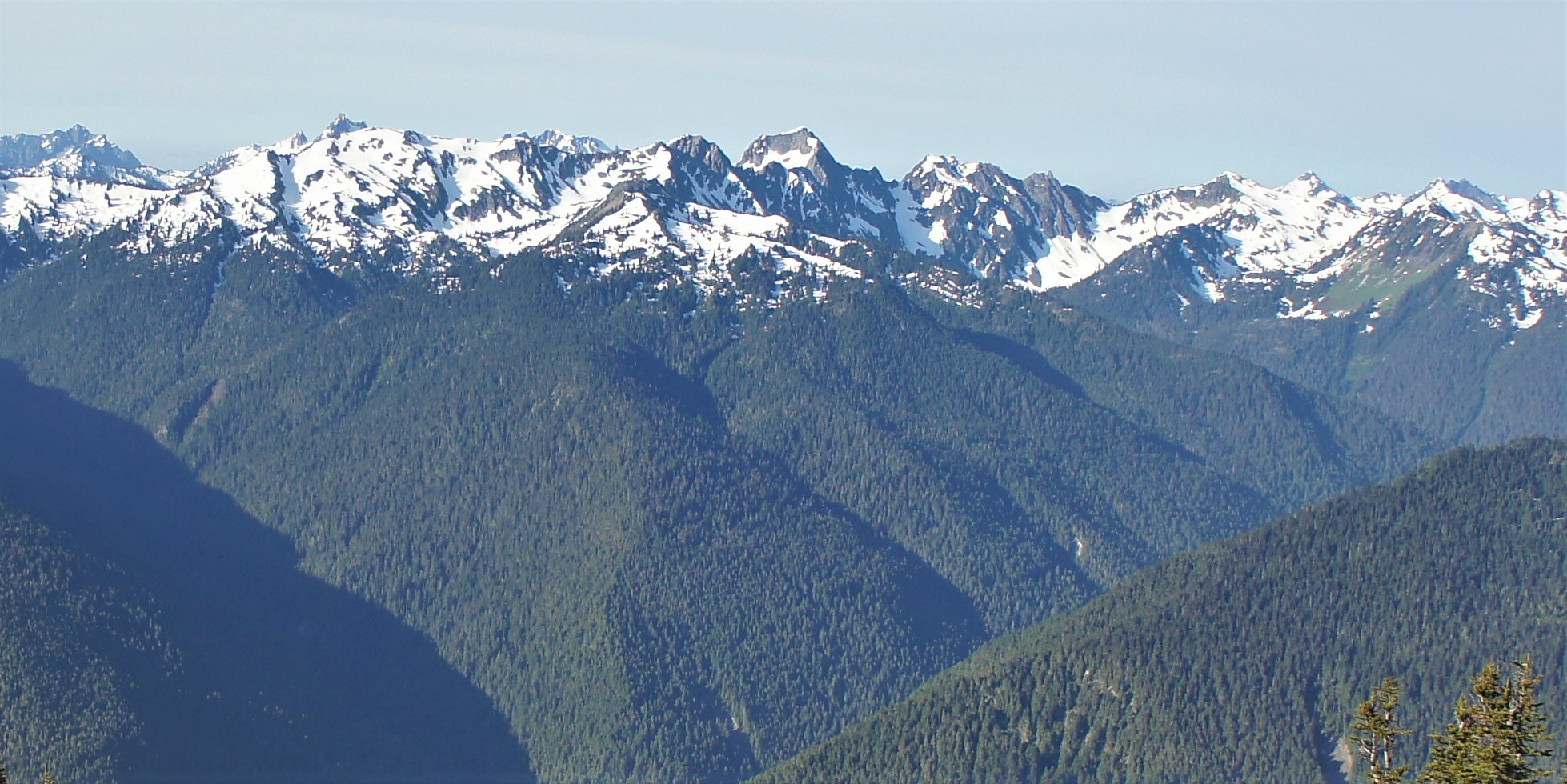
- North aspect of Mt. Elk Lick centered on horizon

Highest point
- Elevation: 6,517 ft (1,986 m)
- Prominence: 1,997 ft (609 m)
- Parent peak: Mount Anderson (7,330 ft)
- Isolation: 4.09 mi (6.58 km)
- Coordinates: 47°41′18″N 123°15′29″W

Geography
- Location within Washington (state) Location within the United States
- Country: United States
- State: Washington
- County: Jefferson
- Protected area: Olympic National Park
- Parent range: Olympic Mountains
- Topo map: USGS Mount Steel

Geology
- Rock age: Eocene

Climbing
- First ascent: 1971
- Easiest route: class 2 via LaCrosse Pass Trail

Mount Elk Lick is a 6,517-foot-elevation (1,986-meter) mountain summit located in the Olympic Mountains, in Jefferson County of Washington state. It is situated within Olympic National Park, and is set within the Daniel J. Evans Wilderness at the head of Elk Lick Creek. The nearest neighbor is Mount La Crosse, 2.54 mi (4.09 km) to the west, and the nearest higher neighbor is Diamond Mountain, 3.73 mi (6.00 km) to the north-northwest. Precipitation runoff from the mountain drains south into the Duckabush River, and north into the Dosewallips River. Topographic relief is significant as the south aspect rises over 4,300 feet (1,300 m) above the Duckabush valley in approximately one mile. The mountain is remote and an ascent can take four days and involves 46 miles of hiking.

== Climate ==
Based on the Köppen climate classification, Mount Elk Lick is located in the marine west coast climate zone of western North America. Weather fronts originating in the Pacific Ocean travel northeast toward the Olympic Mountains. As fronts approach, they are forced upward by the peaks (orographic lift), causing them to drop their moisture in the form of rain or snow. As a result, the Olympics experience high precipitation, especially during the winter months in the form of snowfall. Because of maritime influence, snow tends to be wet and heavy, resulting in avalanche danger. During winter months weather is usually cloudy, but due to high pressure systems over the Pacific Ocean that intensify during summer months, there is often little or no cloud cover during the summer. The months June through September offer the most favorable weather for climbing or viewing the mountain.

== History ==
The mountain's name was officially adopted in 1961 by the United States Board on Geographic Names. The mountain and the creek derive their names from mineral licks located along the Dosewallips and Duckabush rivers near here, where elk and deer drink water.

The first ascent of the peak was made in 1971 by Bartlett Burns, Hugh Favero, and Frank King.

== Geology ==
The Olympic Mountains are composed of obducted clastic wedge material and oceanic crust, primarily Eocene sandstone, turbidite, and basaltic oceanic crust. The mountains were sculpted during the Pleistocene era by erosion and glaciers advancing and retreating multiple times.

== See also ==
- Olympic Mountains
- Geology of the Pacific Northwest
