= Piro's Spire =

Mountain in Washington (state), United States

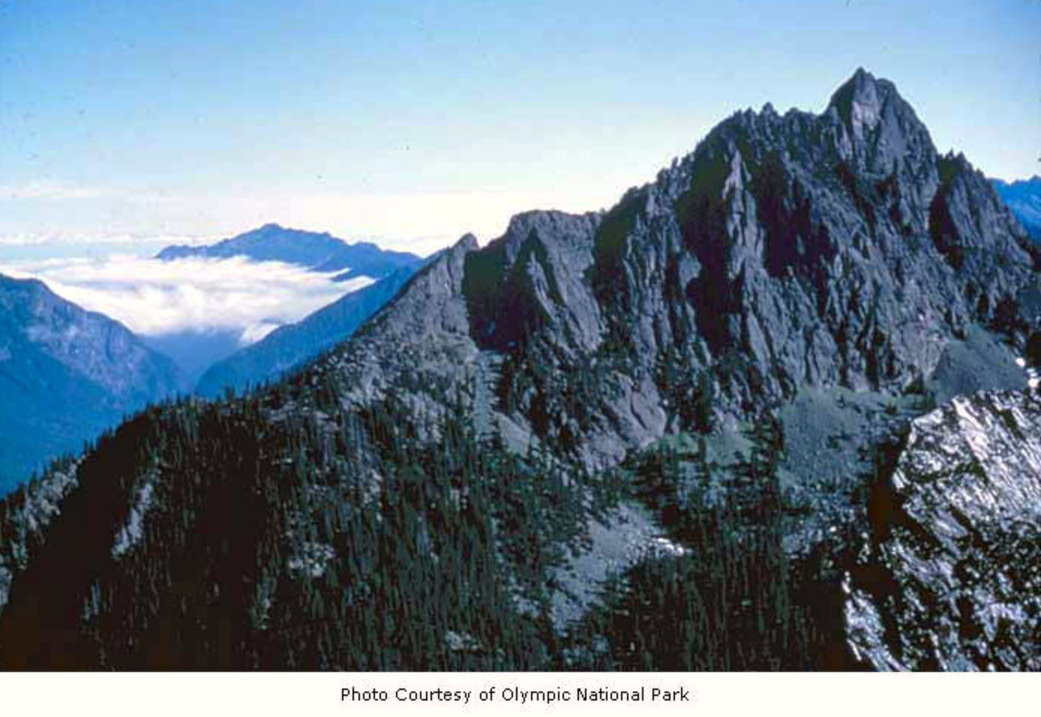

Highest point
- Elevation: 6,259 ft (1,908 m)
- Prominence: 739 ft (225 m)
- Coordinates: 47°44′40″N 123°15′39″W

Geography
- Location within Washington (state) Location within the United States
- Country: United States
- State: Washington
- County: Jefferson
- Protected area: Olympic National Park
- Parent range: Olympic Mountains
- Topo map: USGS Mount Steel

Geology
- Rock age: Eocene
- Rock type: basalt

Climbing
- First ascent: 1947 Don Dooley, Elvin Johnson, Norma Johnson
- Easiest route: Scrambling Class 3 via West Fork Dosewallips Trail

Piro's Spire, (also Piros Spire), is a 6,259-foot (1,908-metre) basalt pinnacle summit in the Olympic Mountains and is located in Jefferson County of Washington state. It is situated in Olympic National Park and the nearest higher neighbor is Diamond Mountain, 1.86 miles (3.0 km) to the west. Both are minor summits of the Mount Anderson massif, with Piro's Spire being the easternmost outlier.

== History ==
The first ascent of the mountain was made in 1947 by Don Dooley, Elvin Johnson, and Norma Johnson. The peak was named by Elvin Johnson in honor of his friend and climbing companion, Robert H. Piro, a former fire guard at the nearby Dose Meadows station (1941). Piro, of the 85th Regiment of the Tenth Mountain Infantry Division, was killed on Riva Ridge in Italy during World War II.

== Climate ==
Based on the Köppen climate classification, Piro's Spire is located in the marine west coast climate zone of western North America. Most weather fronts originate in the Pacific Ocean, and travel northeast toward the Olympic Mountains. As fronts approach, they are forced upward by the peaks of the Olympic Range, causing them to drop their moisture in the form of rain or snowfall (Orographic lift). As a result, the Olympics experience high precipitation, especially during the winter months. During winter months, weather is usually cloudy, but, due to high pressure systems over the Pacific Ocean that intensify during summer months, there is often little or no cloud cover during the summer. In terms of favorable weather, June to September are the best months for climbing the mountain. Precipitation runoff from the mountain drains into tributaries of the Dosewallips River.

== See also ==
- Olympic Mountains
- Geology of the Pacific Northwest
