= Mount Steel =

Mountain in Washington, USA

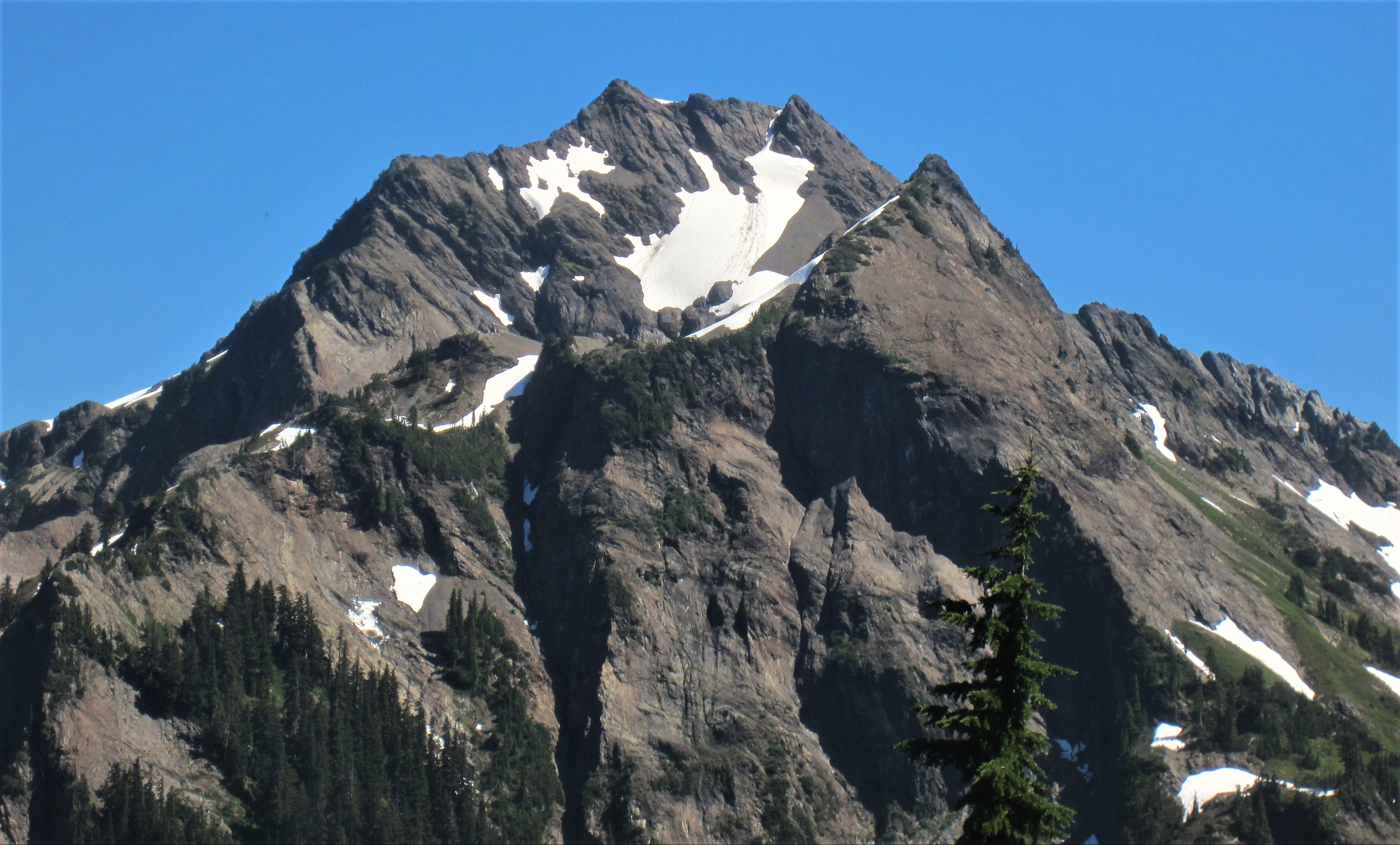
- North aspect of Mt. Steel

Highest point
- Elevation: 6,225 ft (1,897 m)
- Prominence: 825 ft (251 m)
- Parent peak: Mount Duckabush (6,254 ft)
- Isolation: 1.13 mi (1.82 km)
- Coordinates: 47°38′23″N 123°20′10″W

Geography
- Location within Washington (state) Location within the United States
- Country: United States
- State: Washington
- County: Jefferson
- Protected area: Olympic National Park
- Parent range: Olympic Mountains
- Topo map: USGS Mount Steel

Geology
- Rock age: Eocene

Climbing
- First ascent: July 19, 1897
- Easiest route: class 1

Mount Steel is a 6,225-foot-elevation (1,897-meter) mountain summit located in the Olympic Mountains, in Jefferson County of Washington state. It is situated in Olympic National Park and the Daniel J. Evans Wilderness. The nearest higher neighbor is Mount Duckabush, 1.36 mi (2.19 km) to the southwest. Precipitation runoff from the mountain drains south into tributaries of the North Fork Skokomish River, and north into headwaters of the Duckabush River. Topographic relief is significant as the summit rises over 3,400 feet (1,000 m) above the Duckabush River in approximately one mile.

== Climate ==
Mount Steel is located in the marine west coast climate zone of western North America. Weather fronts originating in the Pacific Ocean travel northeast toward the Olympic Mountains. As fronts approach, they are forced upward by the peaks (orographic lift), causing them to drop their moisture in the form of rain or snow. As a result, the Olympics experience high precipitation, especially during the winter months in the form of snowfall. Because of maritime influence, snow tends to be wet and heavy, resulting in avalanche danger. During winter months weather is usually cloudy, but due to high pressure systems over the Pacific Ocean that intensify during summer months, there is often little or no cloud cover during the summer. The months May through October offer the most favorable weather for climbing or viewing.

== History ==
The mountain's name was officially adopted in 1902 by the U.S. Board on Geographic Names. It honors William Gladstone Steel (1854–1934), American journalist and mountaineer who encouraged the US Army to permit one of theirs to explore the Olympic Mountains, which resulted in the 1885 and 1890 O'Neil Expeditions. Steel was also founder of the Oregon Alpine Club, the first mountaineering organization in the Pacific Northwest. Steel recruited three of the club's members to join Lieutenant Joseph P. O'Neil's second expedition, and sometime during or immediately after the expedition, the mountain was christened after him. It was during the second expedition that the north slope of Mt. Steel was burned when a small fire that the group set to eradicate wasps got out of control. William G. Steel led an ascent of Mount Steel on August 24, 1906.

== Climbing routes ==
Established ascent routes on Mt. Steel:

- via First Divide – class 1
- via Marmot Lake Trail – class 1

== Geology ==
The Olympic Mountains are composed of obducted clastic wedge material and oceanic crust, primarily Eocene sandstone, turbidite, and basaltic oceanic crust. The mountains were sculpted during the Pleistocene era by erosion and glaciers advancing and retreating multiple times.

== Gallery ==
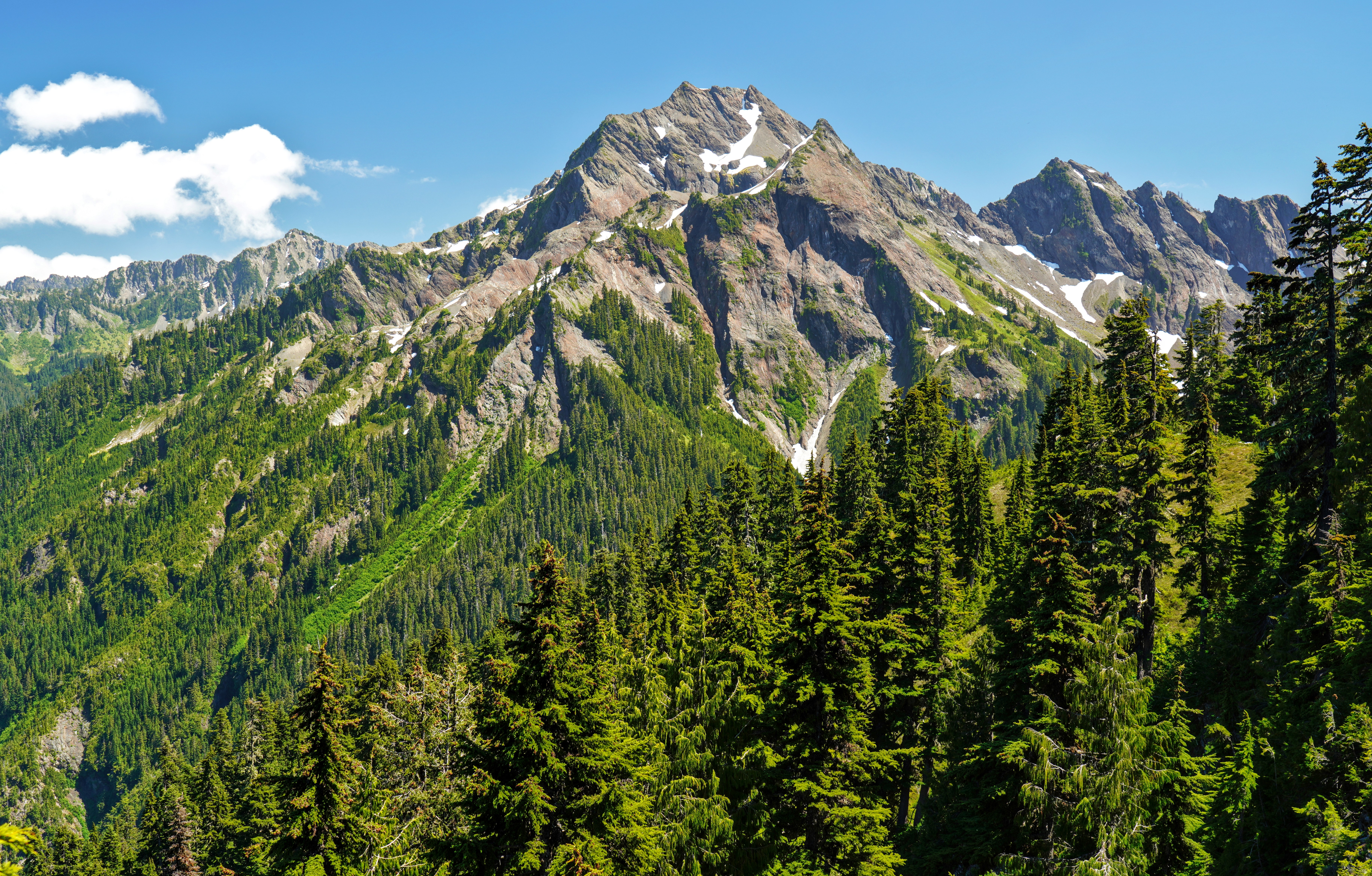
Mount Steel from La Crosse Basin

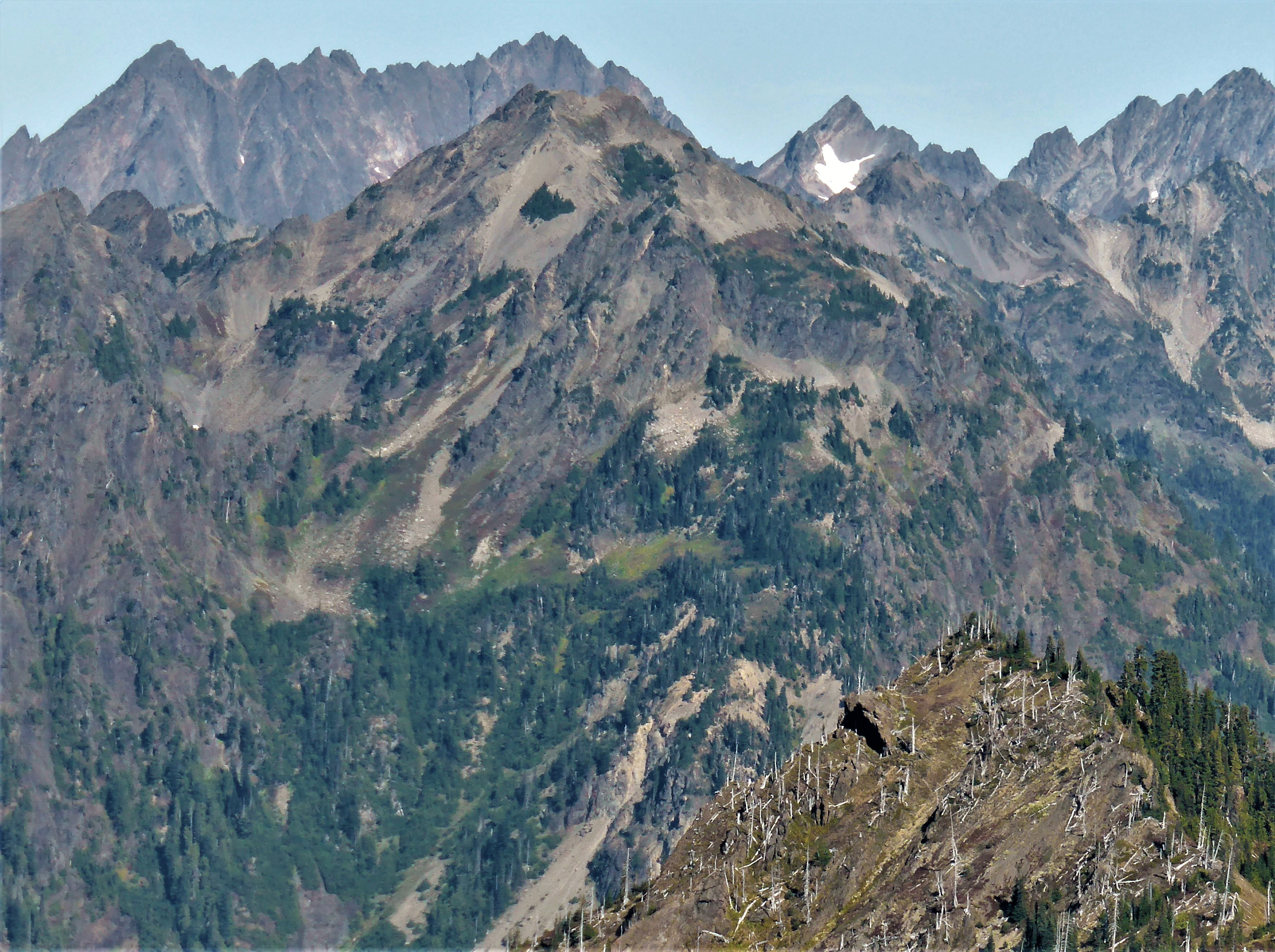
South aspect of Mt. Steel, centered
(West Peak directly behind)

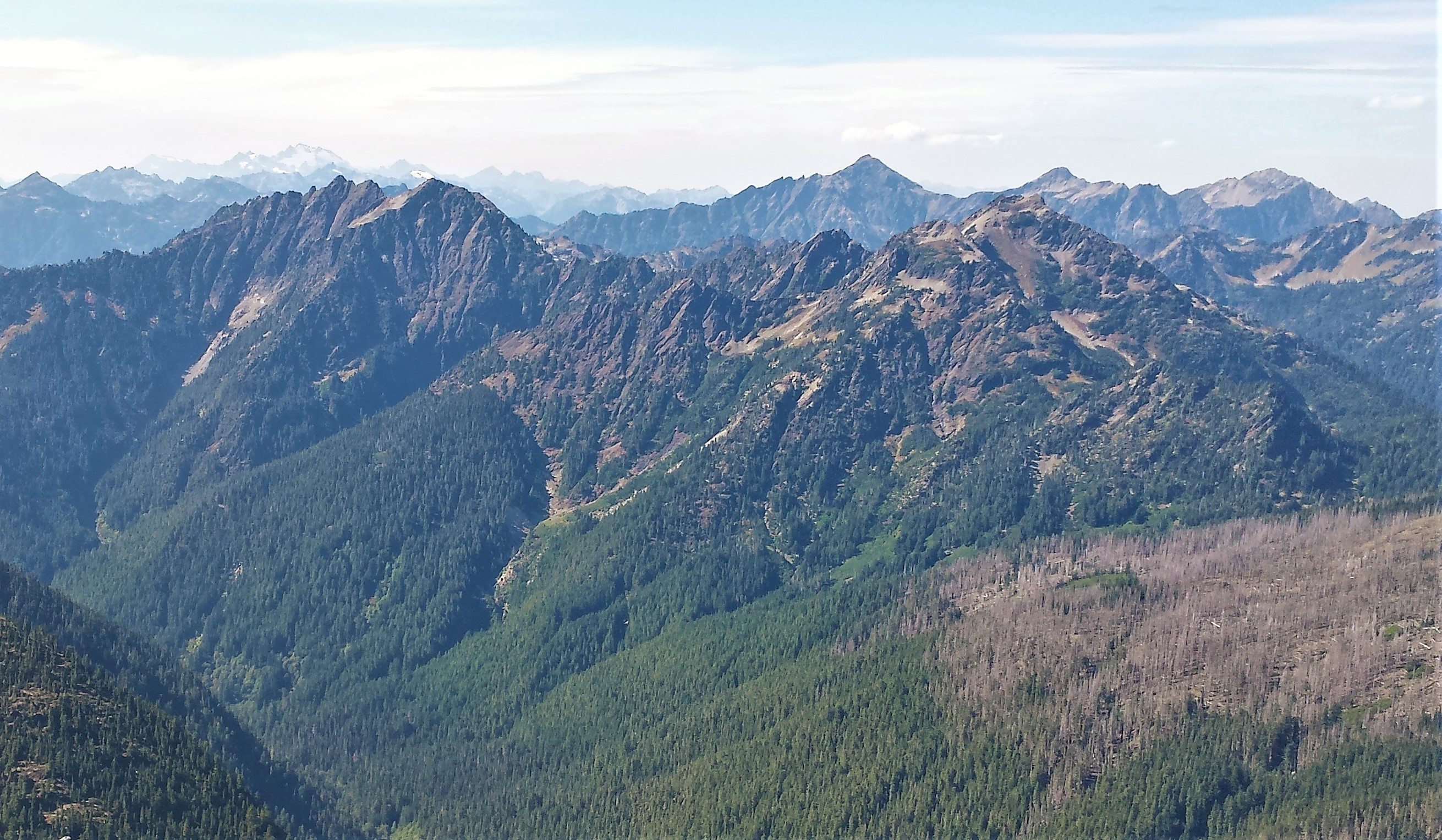
Mt. Duckabush (left) and Mt. Steel (right) seen from Mount Skokomish

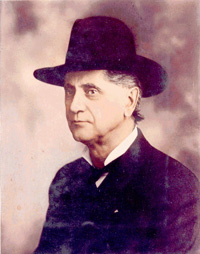
William Gladstone Steel

== See also ==
- Geology of the Pacific Northwest
- Olympic Mountains
