= Eel Glacier =

Glacier in Washington state, United States

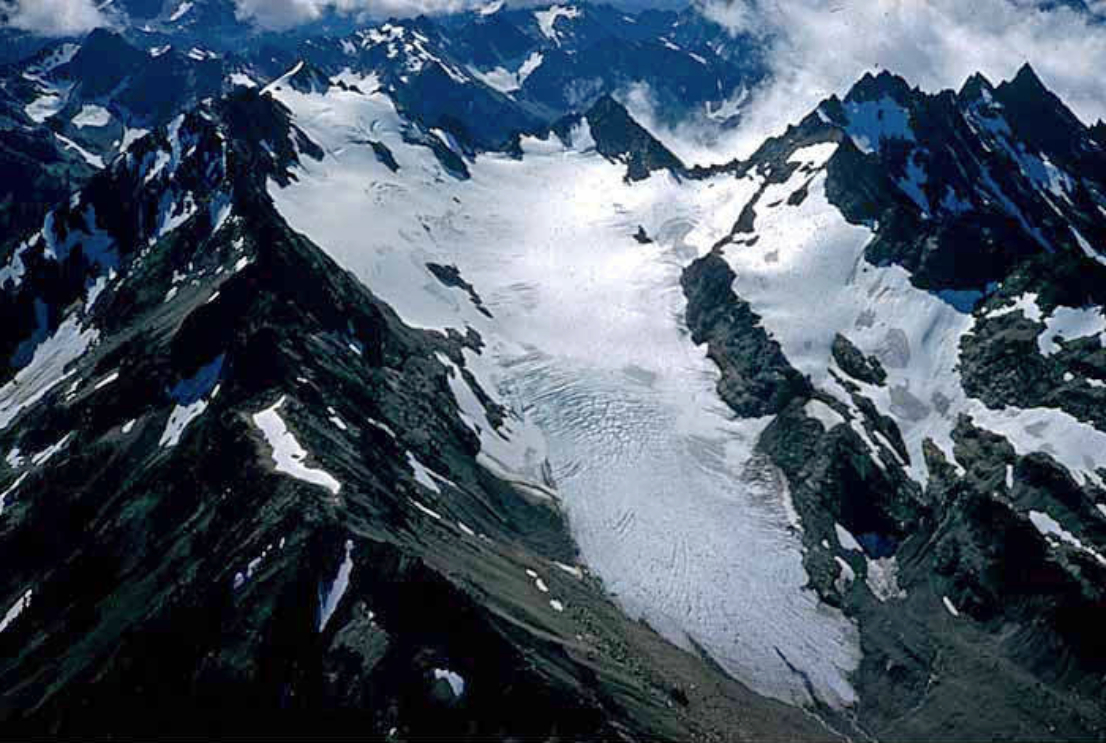
- Eel Glacier centered on the Anderson massif

- Location within Washington (state)
- Type: Mountain glacier
- Location: Mount Anderson, Olympic National Park, Jefferson County, Washington, USA
- Coordinates: 47°43′37″N 123°20′20″W
- Length: 1.05 mi (1.69 km)
- Terminus: Talus/Proglacial lake
- Status: Retreating

Eel Glacier is located to the north of Mount Anderson and east of West Peak, in Olympic National Park in the U.S. state of Washington. The northward-facing glacier starts at about 6,600 feet (2,000 m) in elevation, with an arm extending up to 7,100 ft (2,200 m). As the glacier flows north, it descends in elevation to about 5,200 ft (1,600 m) at its terminus. Meltwater from the glacier gives rise to Silt Creek, which flows through the Olympic Mountains and Olympic National Park. Between 1920 and 2009, Eel Glacier has retreated significantly, losing 50 percent of its surface area.

Eel Glacier's name was obtained by taking mountaineer Fairman B. Lee's last name and spelling it backwards. Lee was a member of the first expedition to summit Mount Anderson in 1920.

== See also ==
- List of glaciers in the United States
