= Anderson Glacier =

Glacier in Washington state, United States

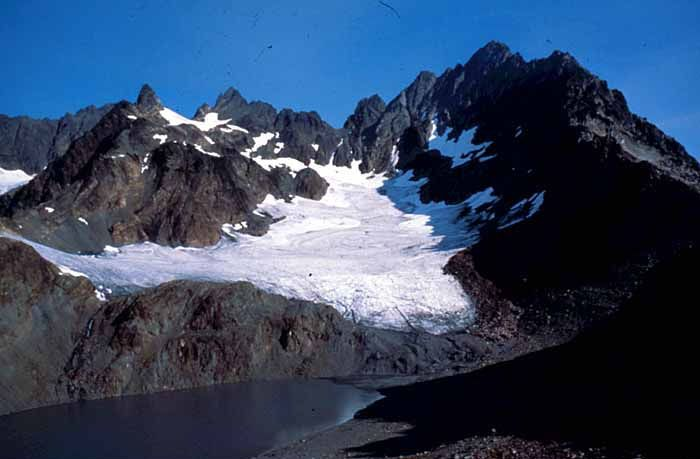
- Anderson Glacier, photographed by National Park Service, date unknown

- Location within Washington (state)
- Type: Mountain glacier
- Location: Mount Anderson, Olympic National Park, Jefferson County, Washington, USA
- Coordinates: 47°42′48″N 123°20′06″W
- Terminus: Proglacial lake
- Status: Severe retreat/extinct

Anderson Glacier was a glacier located in a cirque south of Mount Anderson in the Olympic Mountains and Olympic National Park. The southward-facing glacier starts on the steep headwalls of the cirque at about 6,200 feet (1,900 m) to 6,000 ft (1,800 m). It flows down to about 5,240 ft (1,600 m) before terminating. Meltwater from the glacier enters a lake at about 4,949 ft (1,508 m) before tumbling down a steep cliff. Between 1927 and 2009, Anderson Glacier lost more than 90 percent of its surface area. By 2011, the glacier was gone. The lack of glacial meltwater from the Anderson Glacier has caused the Quinault River to reach new recorded lows.

== See also ==
- List of glaciers in the United States
