= Duckabush River Bridge =

- U.S. National Register of Historic Places
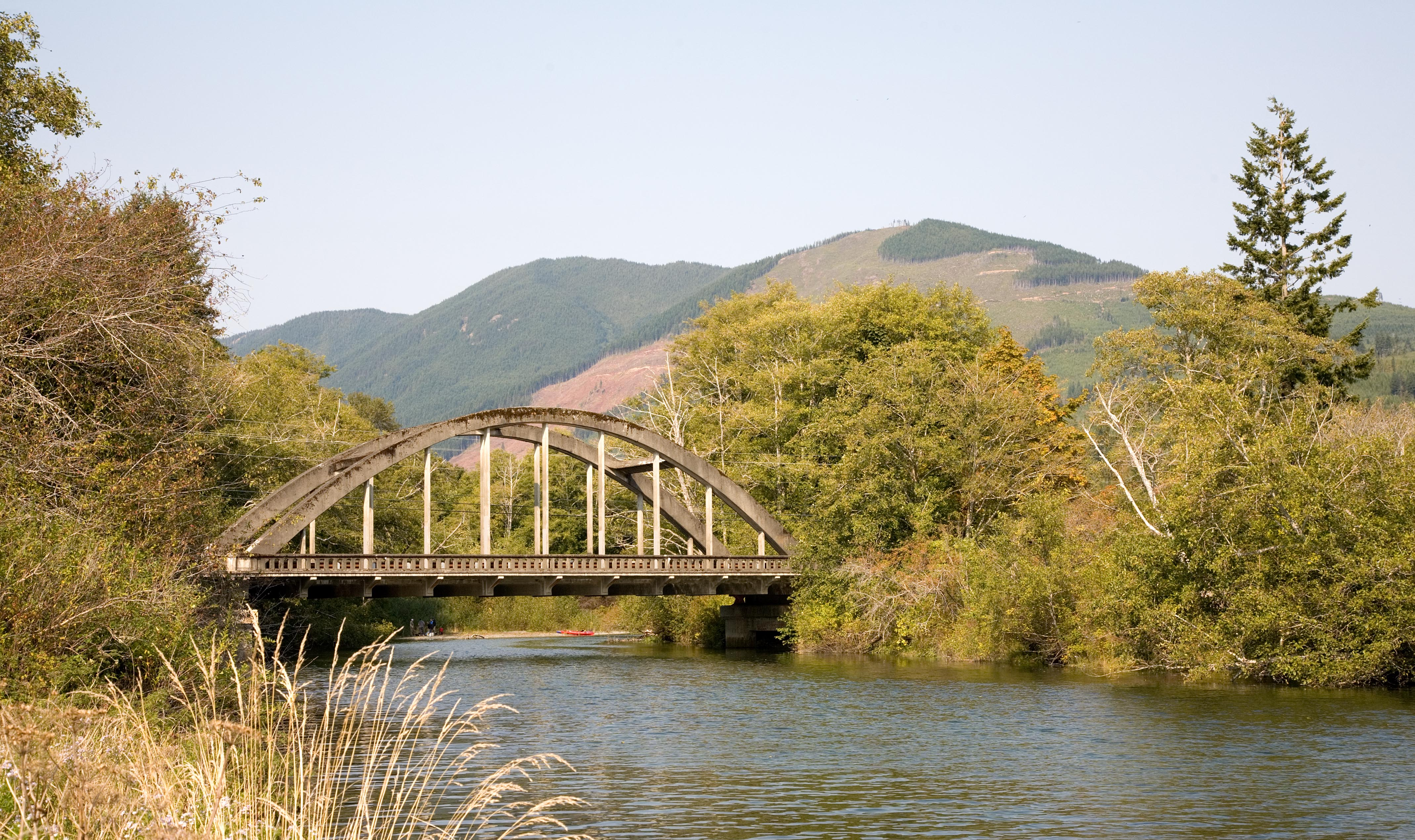
- Duckabush River Bridge

- Location within Washington (state)
- Location: Spans Duckabush River, Duckabush, Washington
- Coordinates: 47°41′25″N 122°53′52″W
- Area: less than one acre
- Built: 1934
- Built by: West Coast Construction Co.
- Architectural style: through-tied ribbed arch br.
- MPS: Historic Bridges/Tunnels in Washington State TR
- NRHP reference No.: 82004219
- Added to NRHP: July 16, 1982

The Duckabush River Bridge is a bridge over the Duckabush River in the Olympic Peninsula in Washington, United States. It is listed in the National Register of Historic Places.

== History ==
As the state of Washington grew, road construction grew in demand. In the 1920s and 30's a series of five reinforced concrete tied arches were constructed within the State. Like In these arches, the deck slab is hung by suspenders from a pair of arch ribs above the roadway. In most arches, massive abutments and foundations are necessary to resist the horizontal thrust exerted by the arch on the skewbacks. In a tied arch design, the horizontal thrust is resisted by longitudinal ties. In the five tied arches in Washington, the deck slab itself acts as a tie. This design eliminates the need of massive abutments to counter the horizontal thrust. This concrete, through tied, ribbed arch was constructed in 1934 by the West Coast Construction Company.

== Appearance ==
The 168 feet (51 m) bridge consists of a 110 feet (34 m) concrete arch and two concrete girder spans. It is 24 feet (7.3 m) wide. The deck slab is hung by suspenders from the pair of arch ribs and acts as a tie. As with a steel arch bridge, the two arch ribs of the Duckabush River Bridge were connected by three struts to provide lateral rigidity against traffic and wind loads. The Duckabush River Bridge is one of five concrete tied arches within the State.
