= West Peak (Jefferson County, Washington) =

Mountain in Washington (state), United States

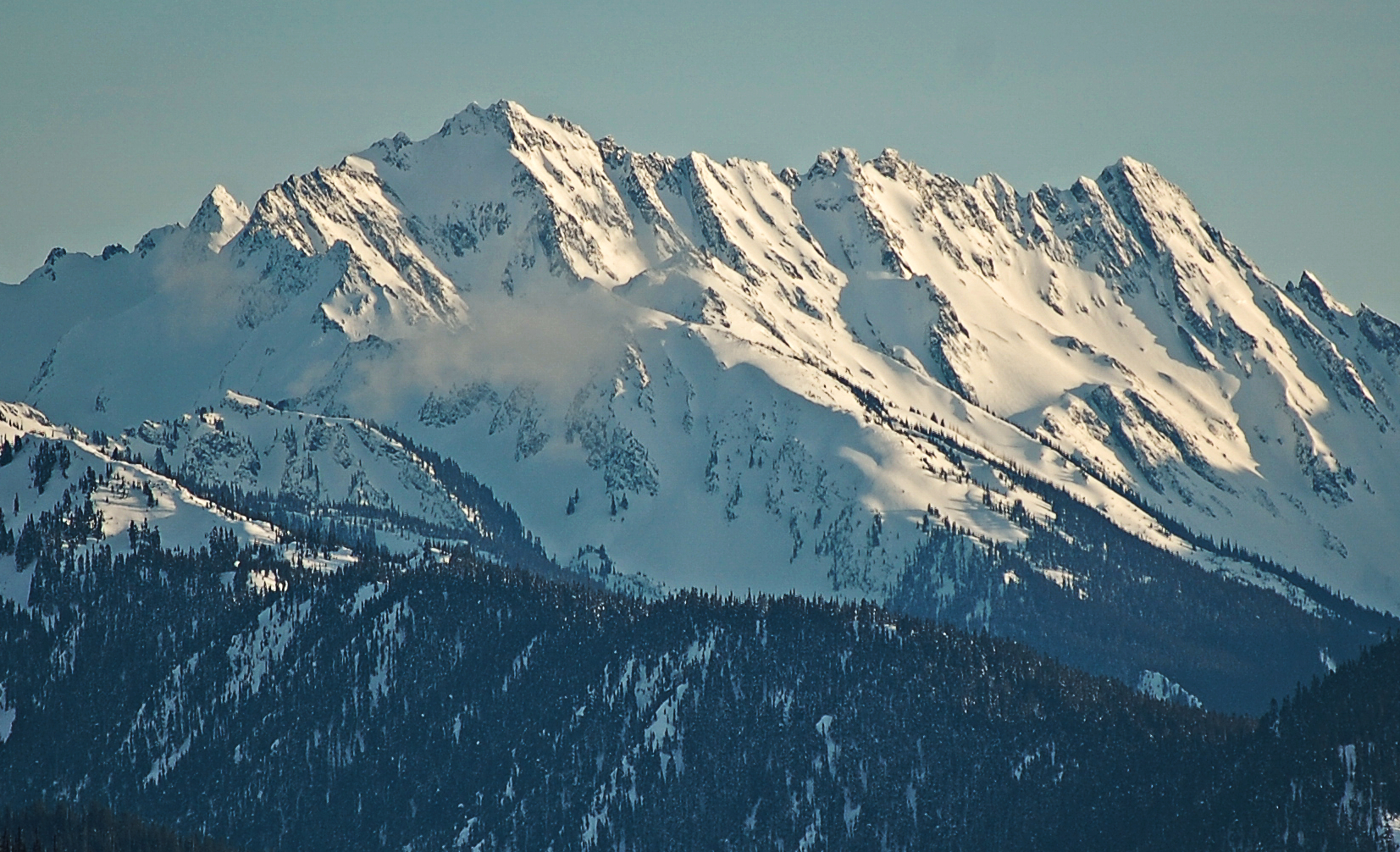
- West Peak in winter

Highest point
- Elevation: 7,365 ft (2,245 m)
- Prominence: 1,965 ft (599 m)
- Parent peak: Mount Mystery
- Isolation: 7.78 mi (12.52 km)
- Coordinates: 47°43′24″N 123°20′56″W

Geography
- Location within Washington (state) Location within the United States
- Country: United States
- State: Washington
- County: Jefferson
- Protected area: Olympic National Park
- Parent range: Olympic Mountains
- Topo map: USGS Mount Steel

Climbing
- First ascent: 1930 by E. B. Hamilton
- Easiest route: Scrambling class 3 via Flypaper Pass

West Peak is a 7,365-foot-elevation (2,245 m) summit in the Olympic Mountains, in Jefferson County of Washington state. Rising in the center of Olympic National Park, it is the highest peak on the Anderson Massif. West Peak is the hydrographic apex of the Olympic Mountains, with precipitation runoff flowing outward to the Pacific Ocean via Quinault River, the Strait of Juan de Fuca via Elwha River, and Hood Canal via the Dosewallips River. The Eel Glacier is situated in a cirque east of the summit, and an unnamed glacier resides in the south cirque. The nearest higher peak is Mount Mystery, 7.73 miles (12.44 km) to the northeast. The first ascent of the peak was made in 1930 by E. B. Hamilton. Legend has it that the mountain's name is for Mr. West, a participant in the 1890 O'Neil Expedition, rather than for its apparent position on the Anderson Massif. The West Branch of the Quinault River was named after him in 1890.

== Climate ==
West Peak is located in the marine west coast climate zone of western North America. Weather fronts originating in the Pacific Ocean travel northeast toward the Olympic Mountains. As fronts approach, they are forced upward by the peaks (orographic lift), causing them to drop their moisture in the form of rain or snow. As a result, the Olympics experience high precipitation, especially during the winter months in the form of snowfall. Because of maritime influence, snow tends to be wet and heavy, resulting in avalanche danger. During winter months weather is usually cloudy, but due to high pressure systems over the Pacific Ocean that intensify during summer months, there is often little or no cloud cover during the summer. The months of July through September offer the most favorable weather for climbing.

== Geology ==
The Olympic Mountains are composed of obducted clastic wedge material and oceanic crust, primarily Eocene sandstone, turbidite, and basaltic oceanic crust. The mountains were sculpted during the Pleistocene era by erosion and glaciers advancing and retreating multiple times.

== Gallery ==
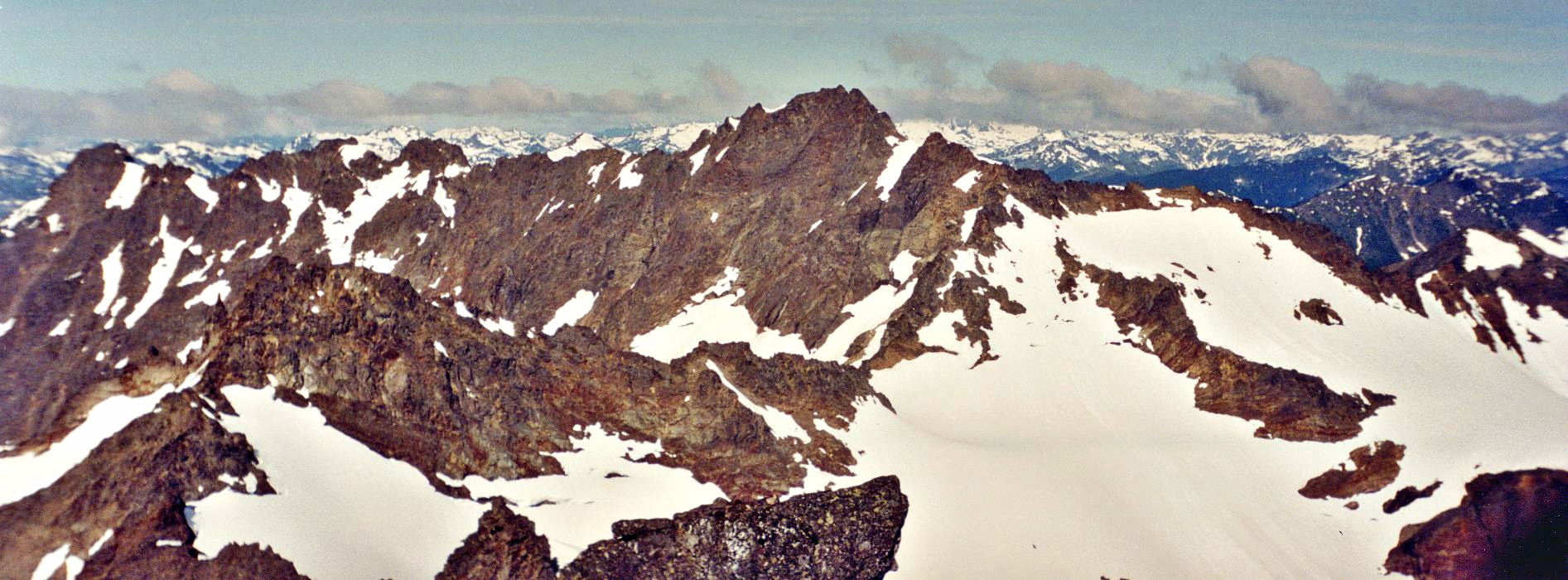
West Peak seen from Mt. Anderson's summit

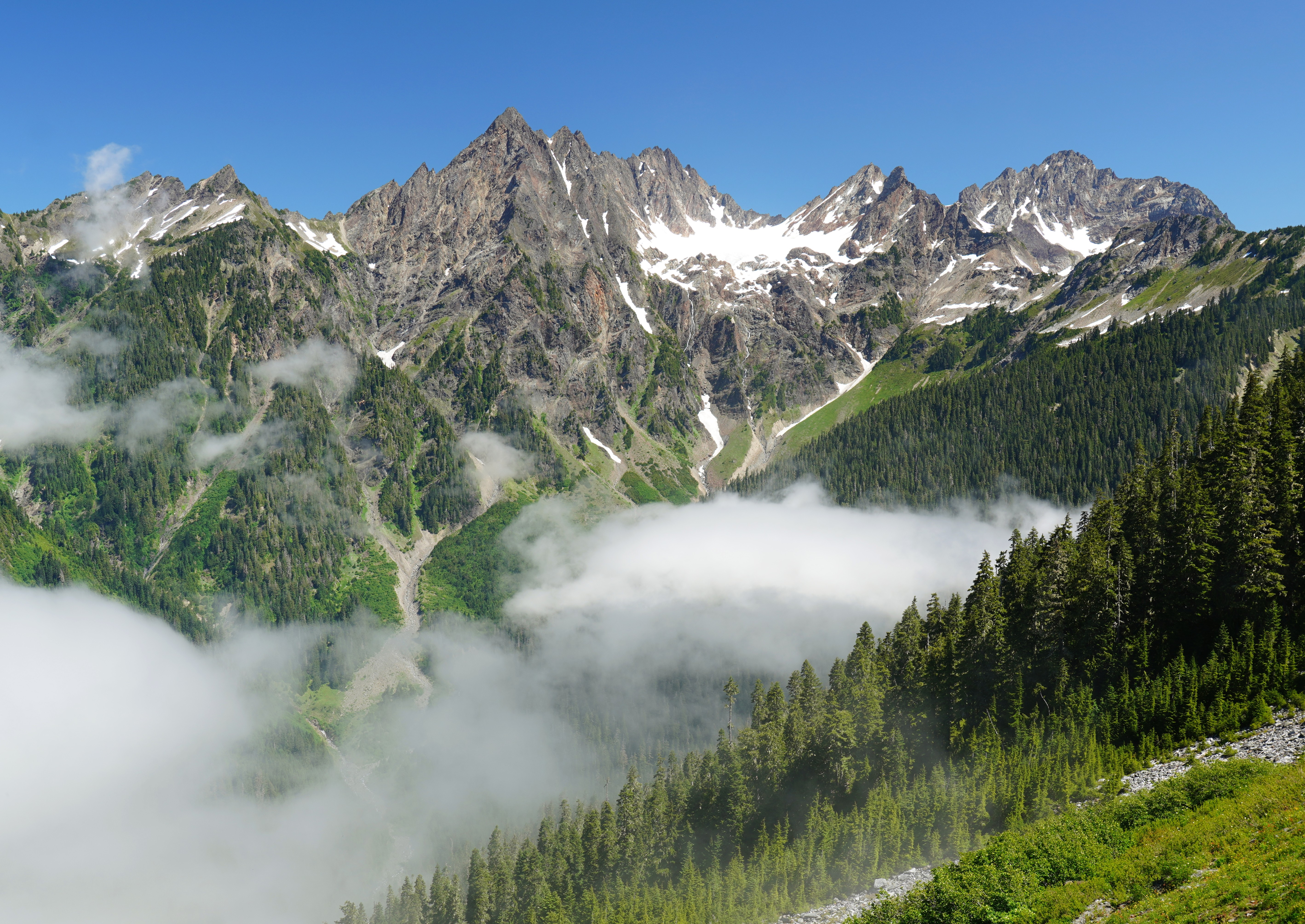
South aspect with summit centered

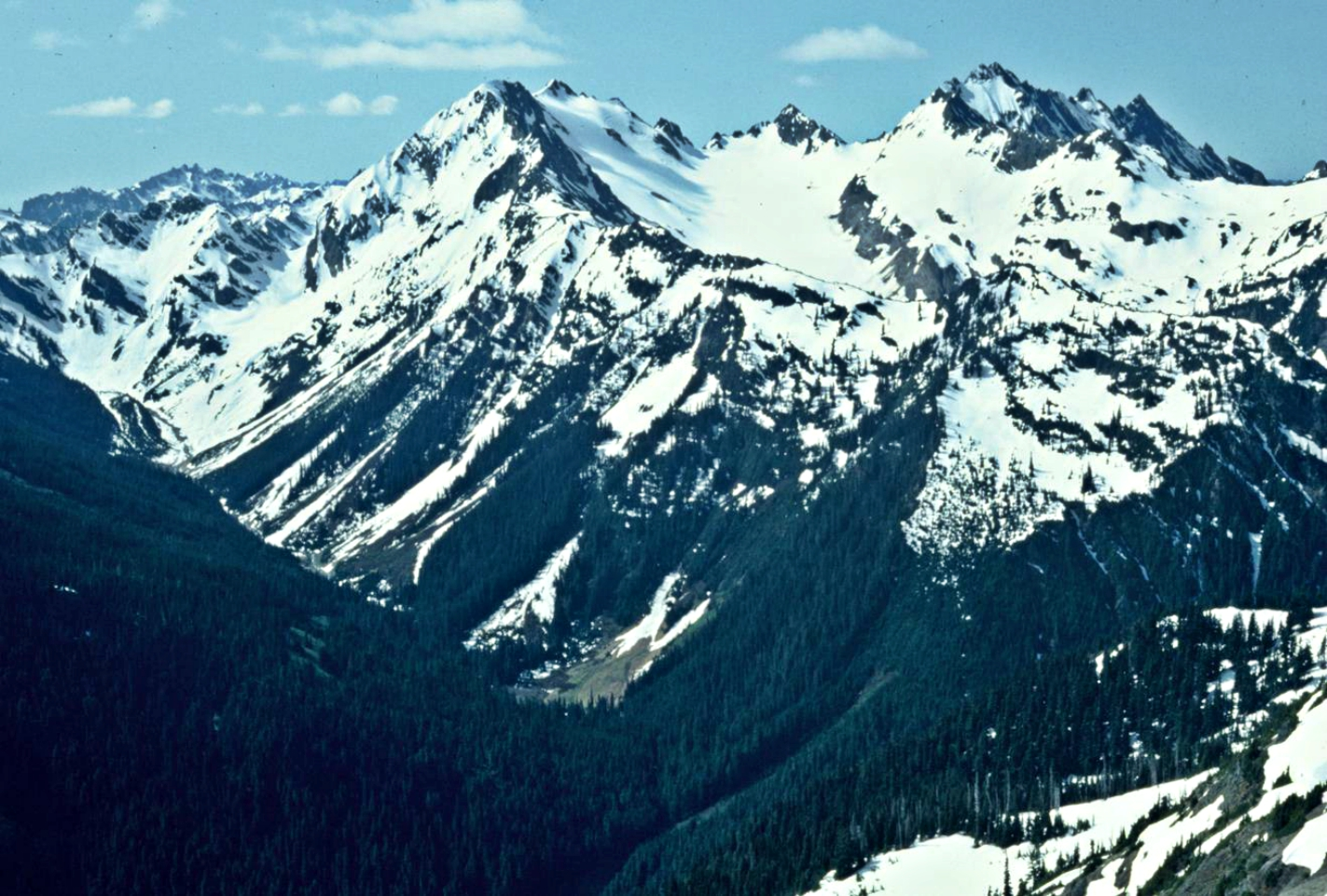
Anderson massif, West Peak to right, as seen from Sentinel Peak

== See also ==
- Geology of the Pacific Northwest
- Geography of Washington (state)
