= Joseph P. O'Neil =

American Army general

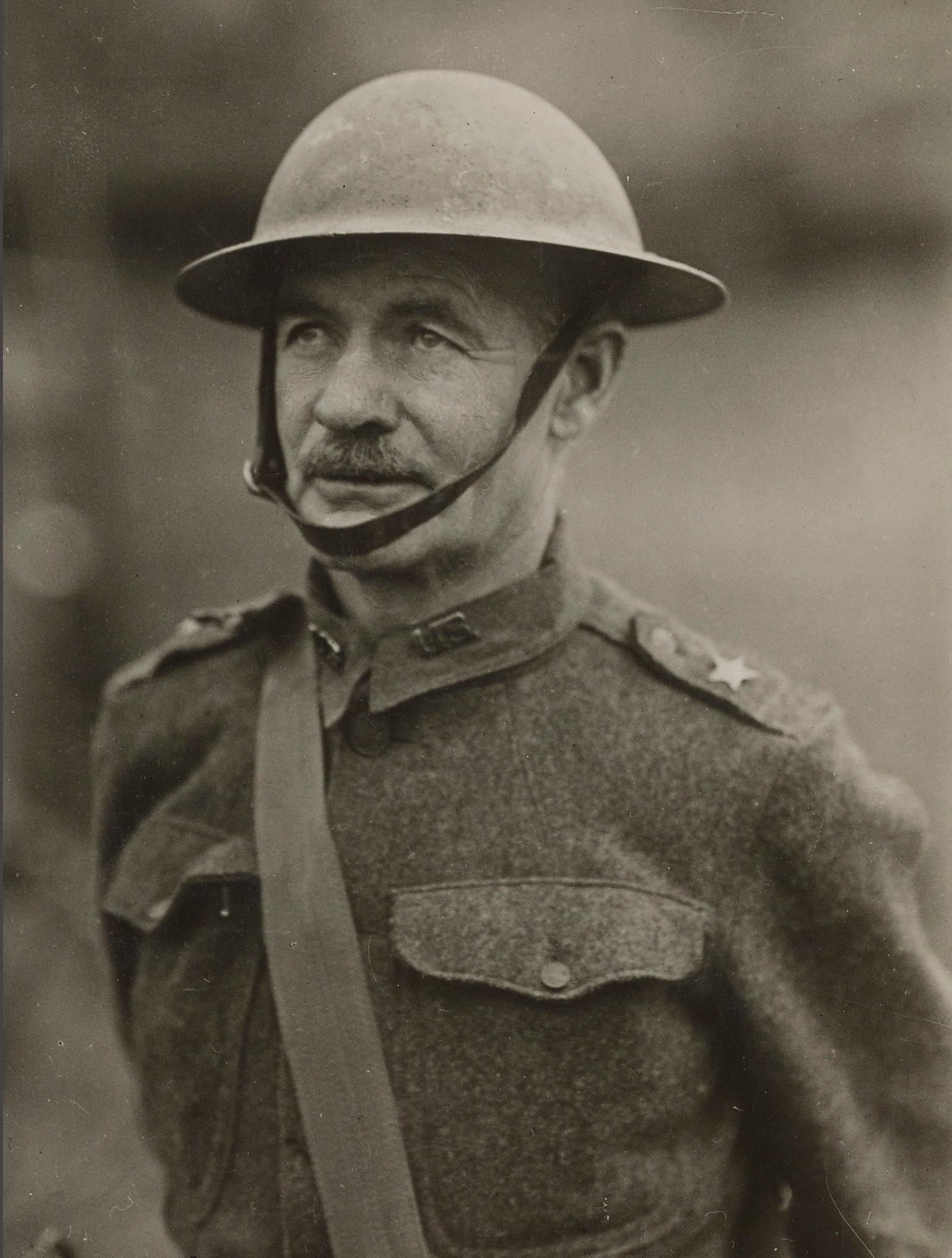
- Brigadier General Joseph P. O'Neil in France, October 1918
- Born: December 27, 1863; Brooklyn, New York State, United States
- Died: July 27, 1938 (aged 74); Portland, Oregon, U.S.
- Burial place: Arlington National Cemetery
- Alma mater: University of Notre Dame
- Spouse: Nina Troup (m. 1891)
- Military career
- Allegiance: United States
- Branch: United States Army
- Service years: 1884–1926
- Rank: Brigadier general
- Service number: 0-140
- Unit: Infantry Branch
- Commands: 21st Infantry Regiment; 179th Infantry Brigade; 90th Division
- Conflicts: Spanish–American War; Philippine–American War; World War I

Joseph Patrick O'Neil (December 27, 1863 – July 27, 1938) was a United States Army officer in the late 19th and early 20th centuries. He served in several conflicts, including World War I.

== Biography ==
Joseph O'Neil was born in Brooklyn, New York, on December 27, 1863, the son of Mary Ann Burke and Major Joseph O'Neil, a Union Army veteran of the American Civil War. After his father's 1867 death, O'Neil's mother married army officer John Murphy, and O'Neil was raised at Army posts throughout the United States. He graduated from the University of Notre Dame in 1883.

In 1884, O'Neil joined the army as a second lieutenant and was assigned to the 14th Infantry Regiment, the same regiment in which his stepfather was then serving, which was then stationed at Vancouver Barracks. From there, he explored the region around Mount Olympus in 1885. He graduated from the Infantry Cavalry School at Fort Leavenworth 1887. As a member of the Oregon Alpine Club, he advocated for the exploration of Mount Olympus, which was finally permitted by General John Gibbon. In summer 1890 O'Neil led the expedition and reached the summit of the southern peak on September 22, 1890.

O'Neil was transferred to Fort Custer in 1892. As a member of the 25th Infantry Regiment he participated in the Spanish–American War and was stationed in Cuba. Later assignments led him to the Philippines and Alaska.

During General Pershing's Pancho Villa Expedition O'Neil was stationed at the Mexican border. In 1916, he commanded the 21st Infantry Regiment, including its role during the Panama–California Exposition.

With the United States' involvement in World War I in August 1917 Joseph O'Neil was promoted to brigadier general of the National Army. During World War I, he commanded the 179th Infantry Brigade, a unit of the 90th Division. After the war, he commanded the division before returning to the United States. He was returned to his permanent rank of colonel and served until retiring in 1926. In 1930, the U.S. Congress passed legislation allowing World War I officers to retire at their highest wartime rank, and O'Neil was promoted to brigadier general on the retired list.

== Personal life ==
O'Neil married Nina Troup on January 15, 1891. After his retirement he lived in Portland and died on July 27, 1938. He was buried in Arlington National Cemetery.

== Legacy ==
Joseph O'Neil is the namesake of O'Neil Peak, O'Neil Pass, and O'Neil Creek in Olympic National Park.

== Bibliography ==
- Davis, Henry Blaine Jr. (1998). Generals in Khaki. Raleigh, North Carolina: Pentland Press. ISBN 1571970886. OCLC 40298151.
