= Mount Duckabush =

Mountain in Washington (state), United States

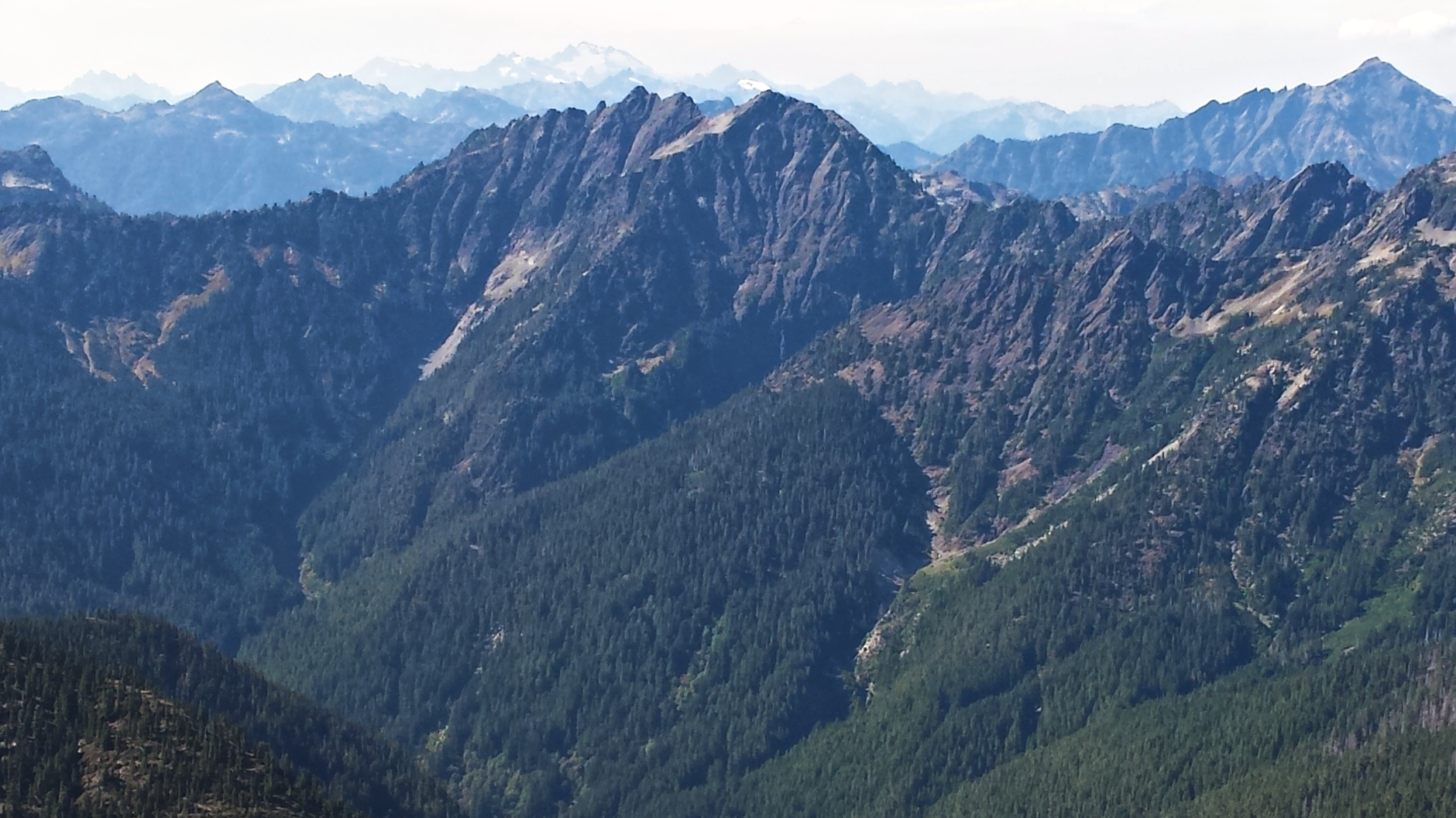
- Mount Duckabush seen from Mount Skokomish

Highest point
- Elevation: 6,254 ft (1,906 m) NAVD 88
- Prominence: 1,250 ft (380 m)
- Coordinates: 47°37′50″N 123°21′42″W

Geography
- Location within Washington (state) Location within the United States
- Country: United States
- State: Washington
- County: Jefferson
- Protected area: Olympic National Park
- Parent range: Olympic Mountains
- Topo map: USGS Mount Duckabush

Mount Duckabush is a 6,254-foot (1,906 m) peak located in Olympic National Park in the Olympic Mountains of Washington state. The headwaters of the Duckabush River include the northwest slopes of Mount Duckabush.

== Climate ==
Based on the Köppen climate classification, Mount Duckabush is located in the marine west coast climate zone of western North America. Most weather fronts originating in the Pacific Ocean travel northeast toward the Olympic Mountains. As fronts approach, they are forced upward by the peaks of the Olympic Range (orographic lift), causing them to drop their moisture in the form of rain or snowfall. As a result, the Olympics experience high precipitation, especially during the winter months. During winter months, weather is usually cloudy, but due to high pressure systems over the Pacific Ocean that intensify during summer months, there is often little or no cloud cover during the summer.

== Gallery ==
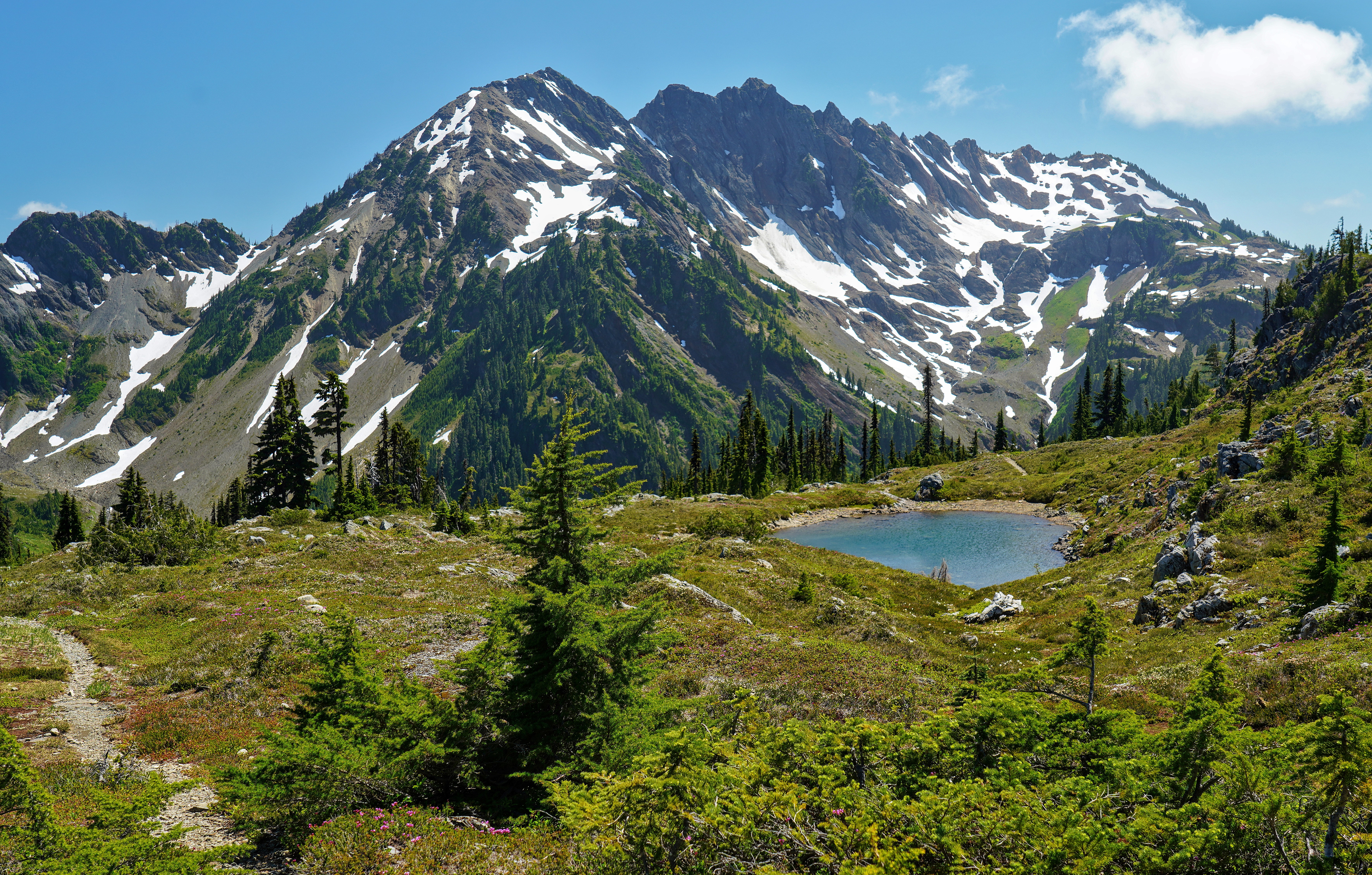
Mount Duckabush

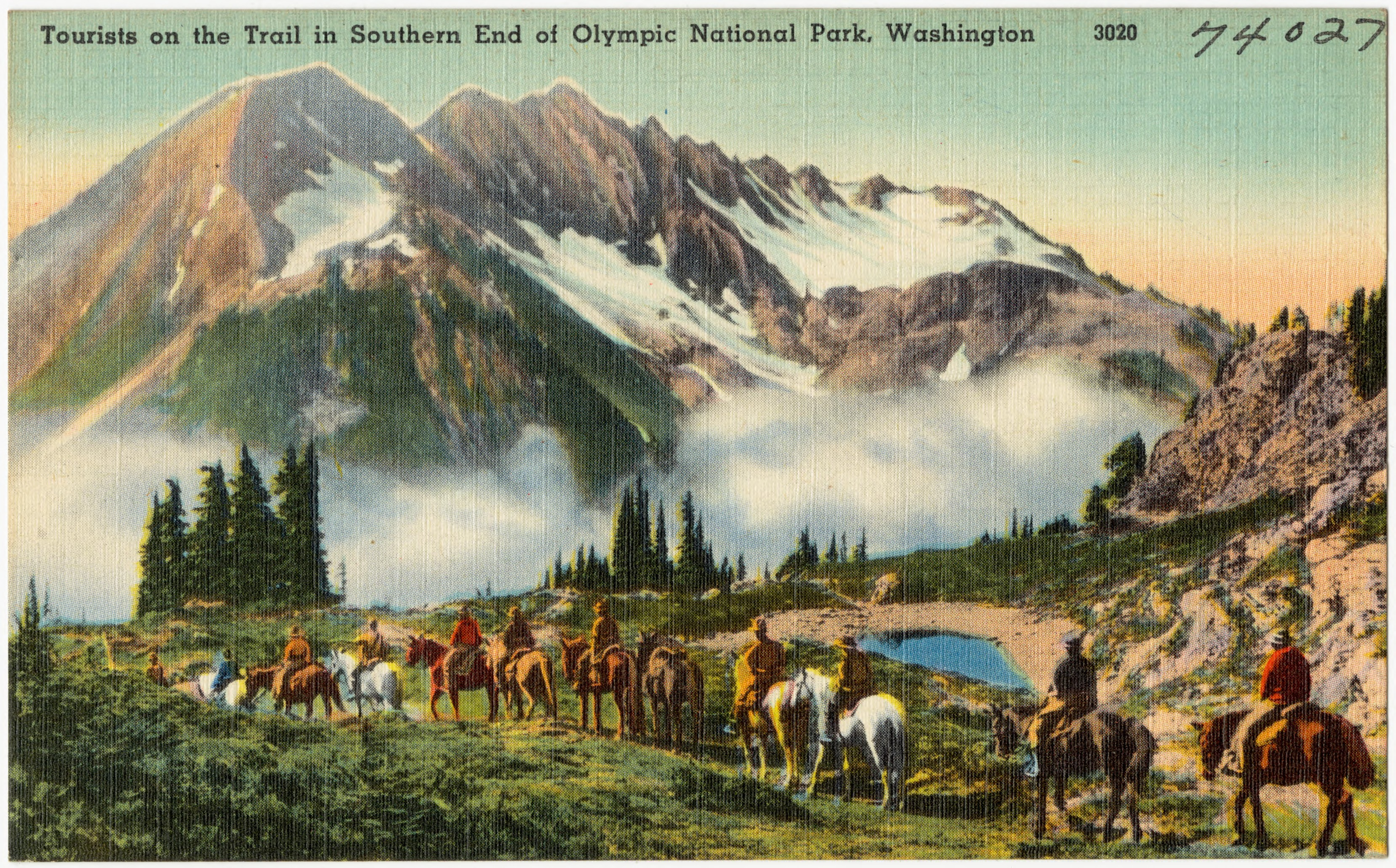
Mt. Duckabush postcard, circa between 1930 and 1945

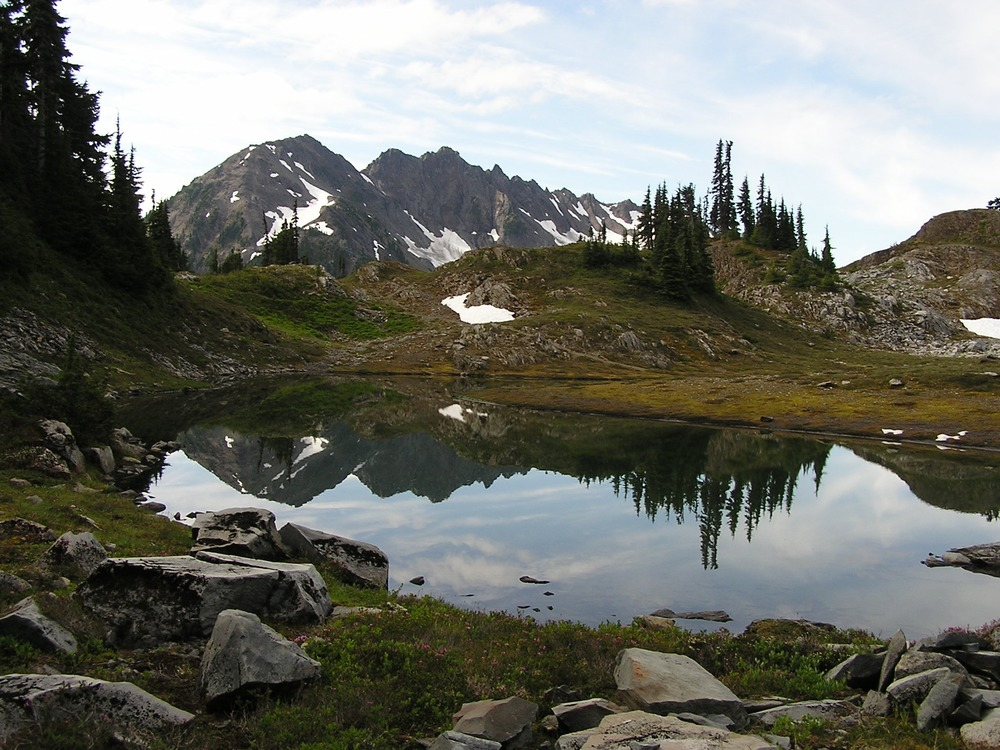
Mount Duckabush

== See also ==
- List of mountains of the United States
- Mount Steel
