= Mount Anderson (Washington) =

Mountain in Washington (state), United States

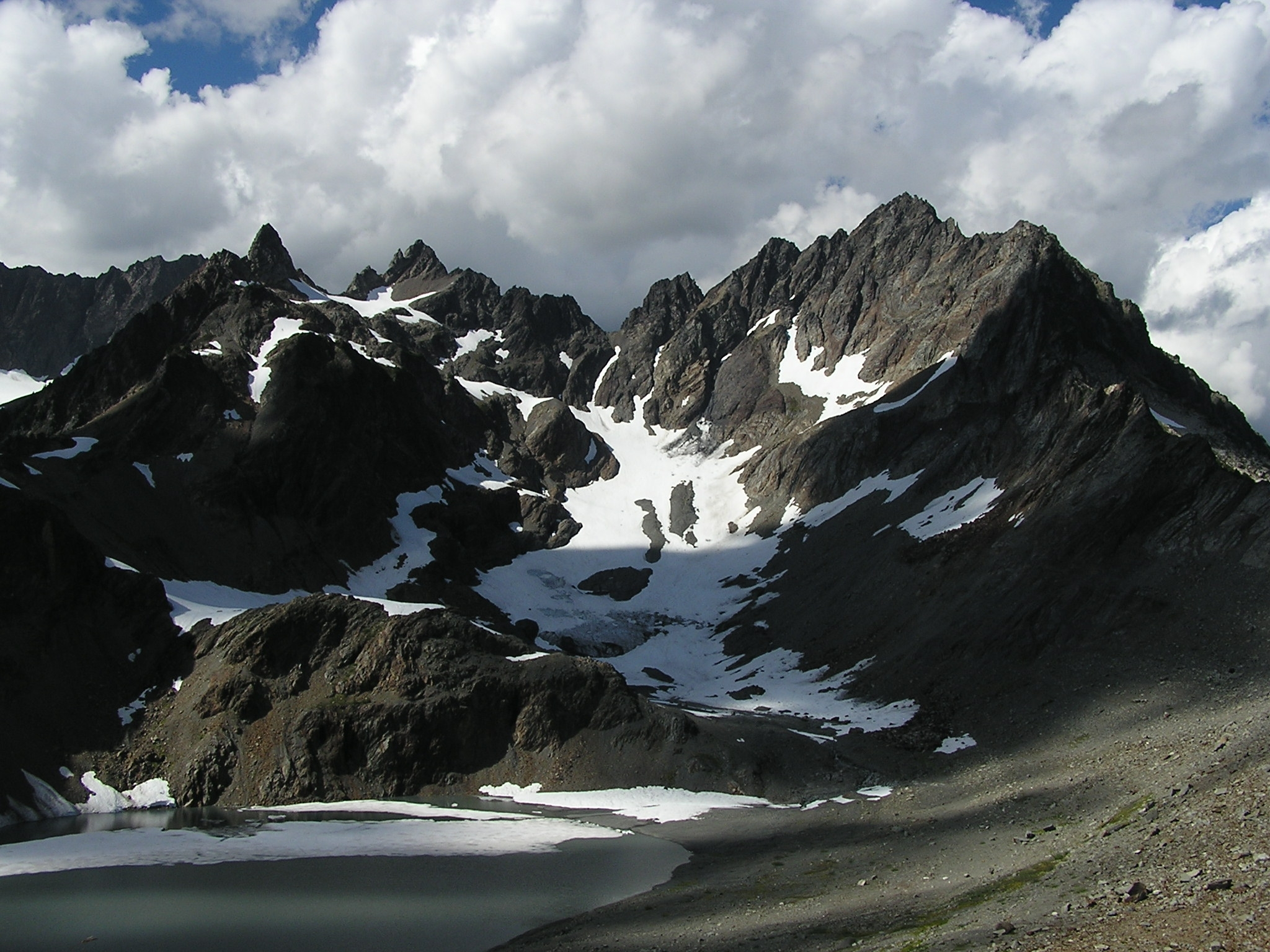
- Mount Anderson

Highest point
- Elevation: 7,330 ft (2,234 m)
- Prominence: 721 ft (220 m)
- Coordinates: 47°43′16″N 123°19′54″W

Naming
- Etymology: Thomas M. Anderson

Geography
- Location within Washington (state) Location within the United States
- Interactive map of Mount Anderson
- Location: Jefferson County, Washington, U.S.
- Parent range: Olympic Mountains
- Topo map: USGS Mount Steel

Mount Anderson is a 7,330-foot-high (2,234 m) peak in the Olympic Mountains of the Pacific Northwest. Rising in the center of Olympic National Park in Washington state, it is the second highest peak on the Anderson Massif, after West Peak. Anderson Glacier used to be located in a cirque on the mountain's southern flank while Eel Glacier is in another cirque, northwest of the summit. Hanging Glacier is on the east side of a ridge which extends north from the peak.

Anderson is at the center of three major watersheds in the Olympic Range. Most of the water which falls on the massif flows into the Dosewallips River which drains, by way of the Hood Canal, into Puget Sound. The drainage from the west side flows down the Quinault River and into the Pacific, while some of the water on the mountain's northwest side flows into the Hayes River which finds its way north, to the Strait of Juan de Fuca.

Mount Anderson was named by army Lieutenant Joseph O'Neil for his commanding officer, Thomas M. Anderson. It was first climbed by settlers in 1920 by Fairman B. Lee and a party of 13.

== Climate ==
Mount Anderson is located in the marine west coast climate zone of western North America. Most weather fronts originate in the Pacific Ocean, and travel northeast toward the Olympic Mountains. As fronts approach, they are forced upward by the peaks of the Olympic Range, causing them to drop their moisture in the form of rain or snowfall (Orographic lift). As a result, the Olympics experience high precipitation, especially during the winter months in the form of snowfall. During winter months, weather is usually cloudy, but, due to high pressure systems over the Pacific Ocean that intensify during summer months, there is often little or no cloud cover during the summer.

== Geology ==
The Olympic Mountains are composed of obducted clastic wedge material and oceanic crust, primarily Eocene sandstone, turbidite, and basaltic oceanic crust. The mountains were sculpted during the Pleistocene era by erosion and glaciers advancing and retreating multiple times.

== See also ==
- Olympic Mountains
- Geology of the Pacific Northwest
- Geography of Washington (state)
