= Duckabush River =

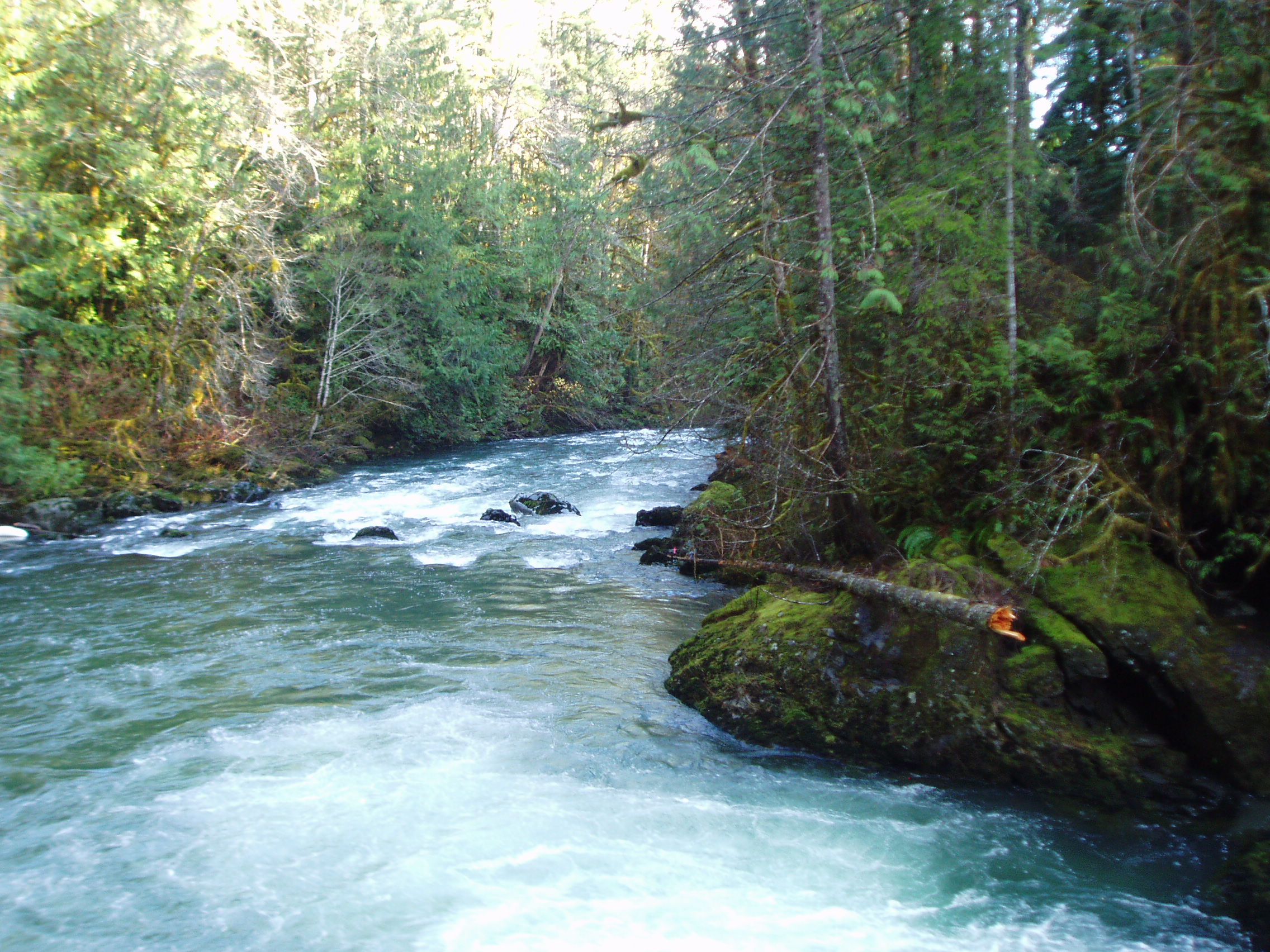
- The Duckabush River within Olympic National Forest

- Location within the United States

Location
- Country: United States
- State: Washington
- County: Jefferson

Physical characteristics
- Source: Olympic Mountains
  - coordinates: 47°39′17″N 123°19′16″W
- Mouth: Hood Canal
  - coordinates: 47°38′55″N 122°56′1″W

The Duckabush River is located in the Olympic Peninsula in Washington, United States. It rises within Olympic National Park near Mount Duckabush and Mount Steel in the Olympic Mountains where it is fed by glacial meltwater. It flows east and drains to Hood Canal, an arm of Puget Sound.

The name "Duckabush" comes from the Twana placename dəxʷyabús, meaning 'place of the crooked-jaw salmon'.

== History ==
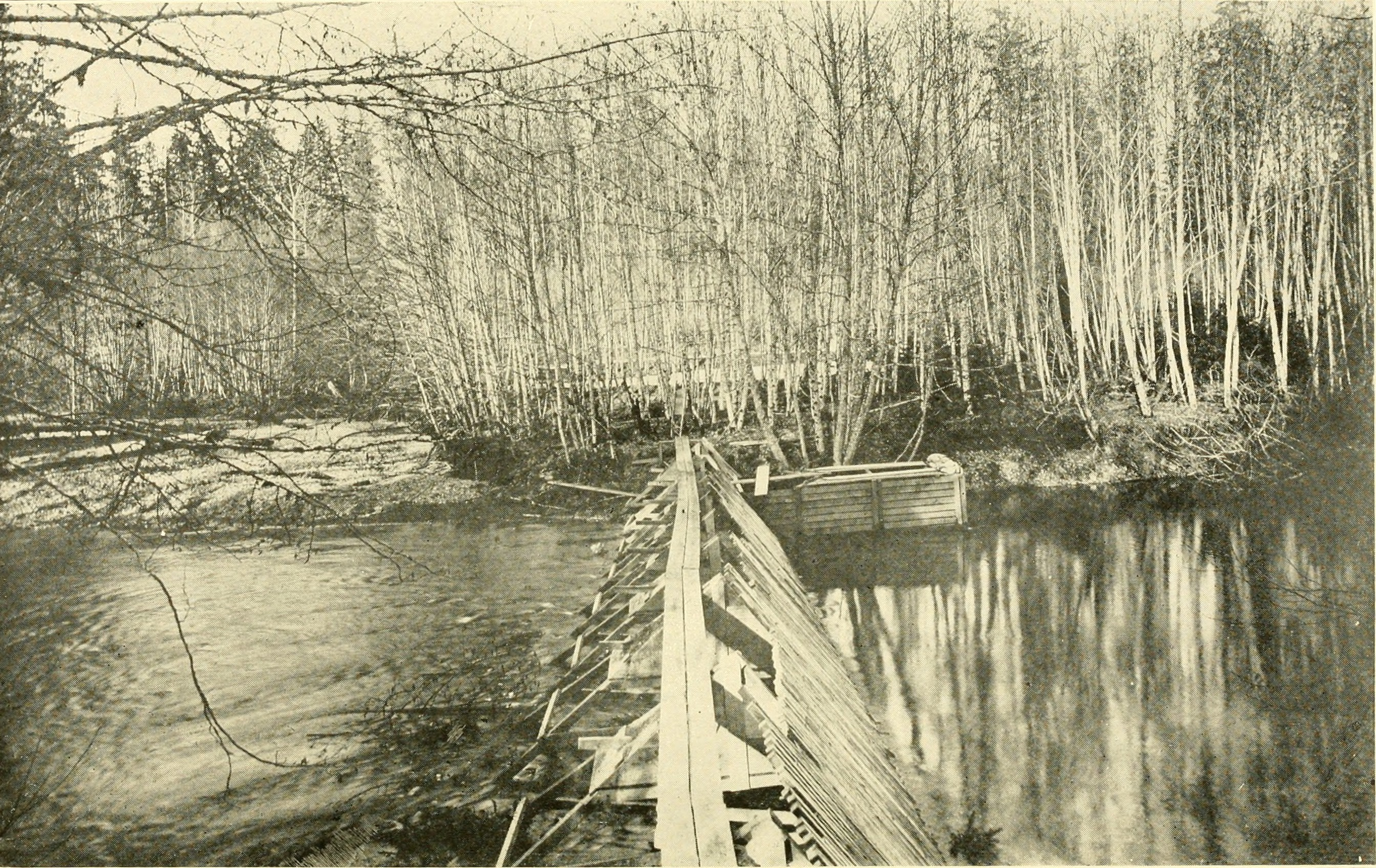
Salmon trap on the Duckabush River, 1919

The Duckabush River from the Twana dəxʷyabús meaning 'place of the crooked-jaw salmon', and its surrounding lands were inhabited by the Twana, a Coast Salish group with a village near the river's mouth at present-day Brinnon. The village and its inhabitants were known also as the Duckabush. The Duckabush group were historically completely autonomous and independent as the Twana were bound by no higher political power, but only by shared language, location, and cultural practices. While the area in the immediate vicinity of a group's village would be exclusive use, the vast majority of land was used freely by all Twana groups.

In 1855, the United States enacted the Treaty of Point No Point, which required all Native Americans living within northern Kitsap Peninsula and Olympic Peninsula to migrate from their lands and into reservations within one year after it was passed. After this would only a few Duckabush remain, such as the wife of Ewell P. Brinnon, a settler who became the namesake of the community at the river's mouth. In 1891, Brinnon was established when the post office began operations in the settlement.

== Course ==
The Duckabush River rises within Olympic National Park near Mount Duckabush and Mount Steel in the Olympic Mountains where it is fed by the meltwaters of the Duckabush Glacier. It flows east from its source in a deep mountain valley with tributaries outflowing from alpine lakes merging with it as it passes between The Brothers and Mount Elk Lick. The upper reaches of the river were carved out rapidly by flowing water during periods where the glaciers had receded to the mountain peaks. The carving by the Duckabush in these uplands exposed pillow lava, formed during rapid cooling of lava during the submarine creation of the Crescent Formation. The pillow lava can be found along the cliffs flanking the river.

After being fed by more creeks originating from Mount Jupiter to the north, the river begins to descend less rapidly. During the last three miles (5 km) of its course, the river travels through a relatively flat lowland with a width of approximately 2,500 feet (800 m) extending to its mouth. Finally the river drains to Hood Canal where it has a relatively broad delta characterized by mud flats.

== River modifications ==
Very few modifications exist on the Duckabush River west of the lowland river valley extending three miles (5 km) west from its mouth at the Hood Canal in Brinnon, though campgrounds and trails follow the river's course through the public lands leading down to that valley. Within Brinnon, more human development has occurred than upstream. The Duckabush River was the center of the initial settlement that would later become Brinnon despite the low river valley being prone to flooding.

In 1934, the Duckabush River Bridge was built, carrying U.S. Route 101 over the river. A hatchery operated by the United States Bureau of Fisheries and later the United States Fish and Wildlife Service existed on the river from 1911 to 1942.

== See also ==
- List of Washington rivers
