= Adelaide Peak (Washington) =

Mountain in Washington, U.S.

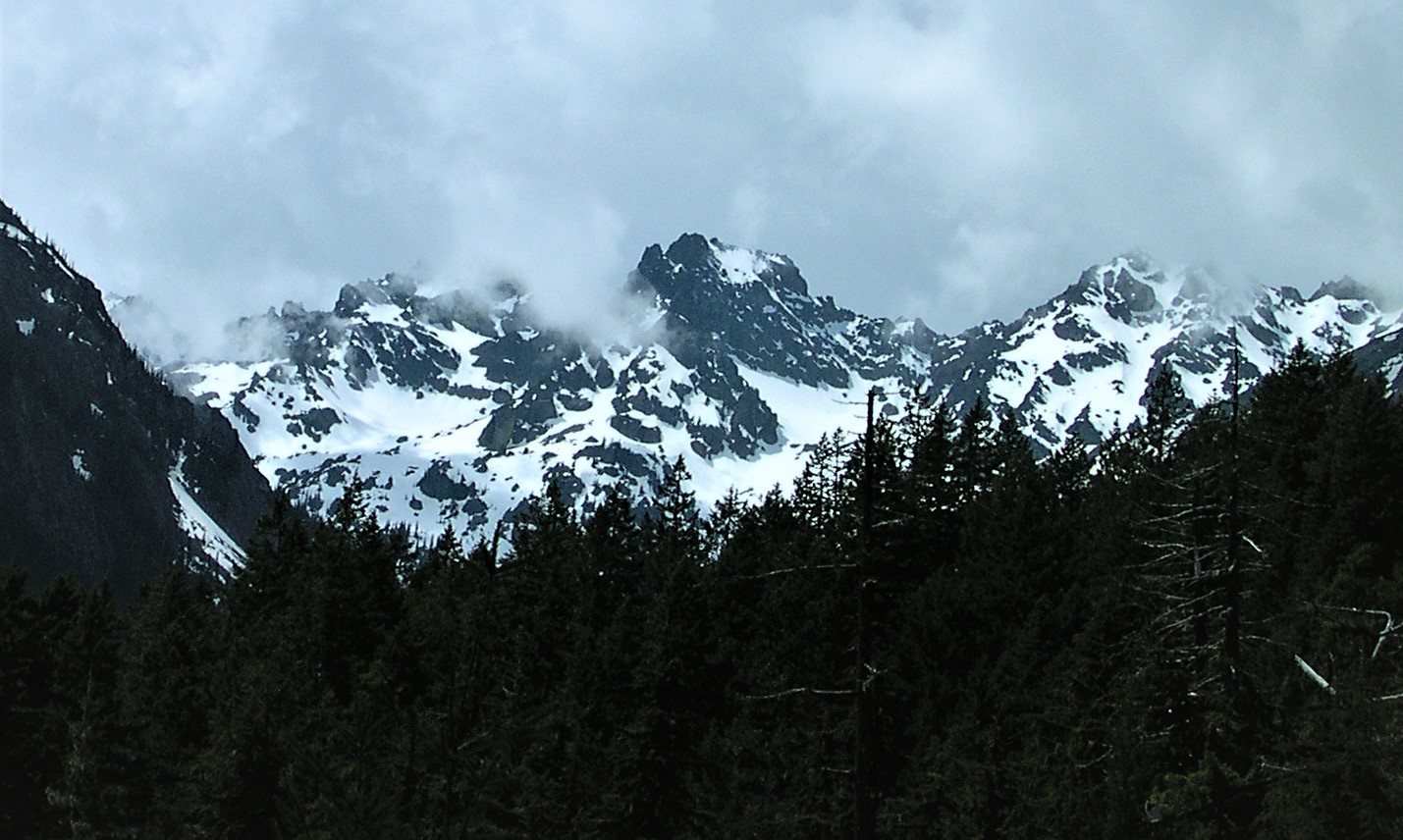
- Adelaide Peak centered, northeast aspect

Highest point
- Elevation: 7,300 ft (2,225 m)
- Prominence: 120 ft (37 m)
- Parent peak: Mount Clark (7,528 ft)
- Isolation: 0.30 mi (0.48 km)
- Coordinates: 47°50′24″N 123°13′53″W

Geography
- Location within Washington (state) Location within the United States
- Interactive map of Adelaide Peak
- Country: United States
- State: Washington
- County: Jefferson
- Protected area: Olympic National Park
- Parent range: Olympic Mountains
- Topo map: USGS Mount Deception

Geology
- Rock age: Eocene

Climbing
- First ascent: 1944
- Easiest route: class 3 scrambling

Adelaide Peak is a 7,300-foot-elevation (2,200-meter) mountain summit located in the Olympic Mountains, in Jefferson County of Washington state. It is situated within Olympic National Park and the Daniel J. Evans Wilderness. It is part of The Needles range, which is a subset of the Olympic range. The nearest higher peak is Mount Clark, 0.3 mi (0.48 km) to the south, and Mount Walkinshaw rises 0.66 mi (1.06 km) to the north-northwest. The peak is in the rain shadow of the Olympic Range, resulting in less precipitation than Mount Olympus and the western Olympics receive. Precipitation runoff from the mountain drains east into Royal Creek, and west into Gray Wolf River, which are both within the drainage basin of the Dungeness River. Topographic relief is significant as the east aspect rises 2,600 feet (790 m) above Royal Creek in less than one mile.

== History ==
The first ascent of the peak was made in 1944 by Adel and William Degenhardt. The mountain's name commemorates Adelaide Degenhardt, who made that first ascent. The mountain's name was submitted for consideration in 1958 by Kent Heathershaw and Robert McKee to recognize the Degenhardts for pioneering the Needles area as a climbing area. The husband-wife climbing duo also made the first ascent of nearby Sundial the same year. William Degenhardt is the namesake of Mount Degenhardt located in North Cascades National Park. This landform's toponym has not been officially adopted by the U.S. Board on Geographic Names, so the mountain is not labeled as Adelaide Peak on USGS maps.

== Climate ==
Adelaide Peak is located in the marine west coast climate zone of western North America. Weather fronts originating in the Pacific Ocean travel northeast toward the Olympic Mountains. As fronts approach, they are forced upward by the peaks (orographic lift), causing them to drop their moisture in the form of rain or snow. As a result, the Olympics experience high precipitation, especially during the winter months in the form of snowfall. Because of maritime influence, snow tends to be wet and heavy, resulting in high avalanche danger. During winter months weather is usually cloudy, but due to high pressure systems over the Pacific Ocean that intensify during summer months, there is often little or no cloud cover during the summer. The months of July through September offer the most favorable weather for climbing Adelaide Peak.

== Geology ==
The Olympic Mountains are composed of obducted clastic wedge material and oceanic crust, primarily Eocene sandstone, turbidite, and basaltic oceanic crust. The mountains were sculpted during the Pleistocene era by erosion and glaciers advancing and retreating multiple times.

== Gallery ==
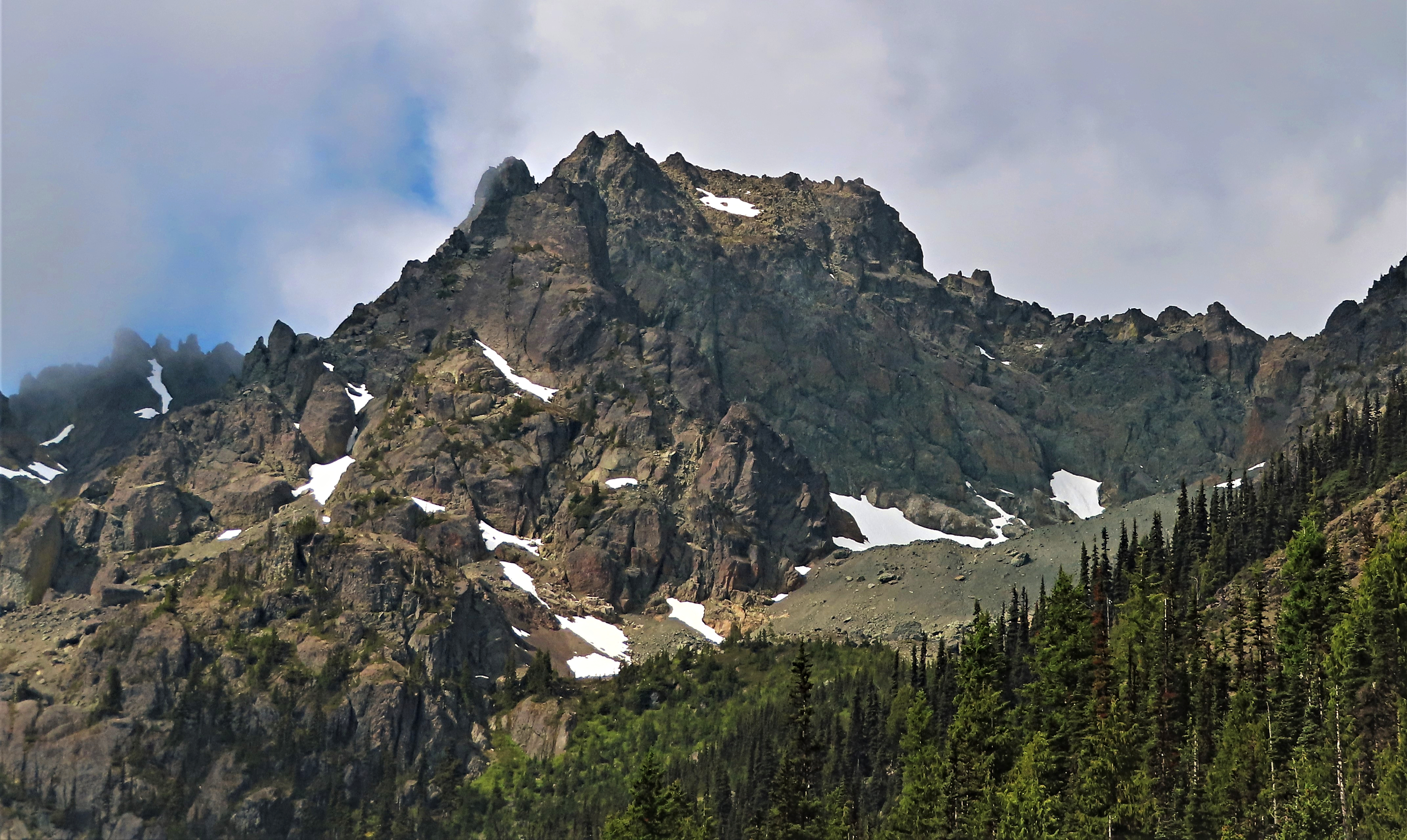
Adelaide Peak

== See also ==
- Geology of the Pacific Northwest
