= Fire Station No. 23 (Seattle) =

Former fire station in Seattle, Washington, U.S.

- U.S. National Register of Historic Places
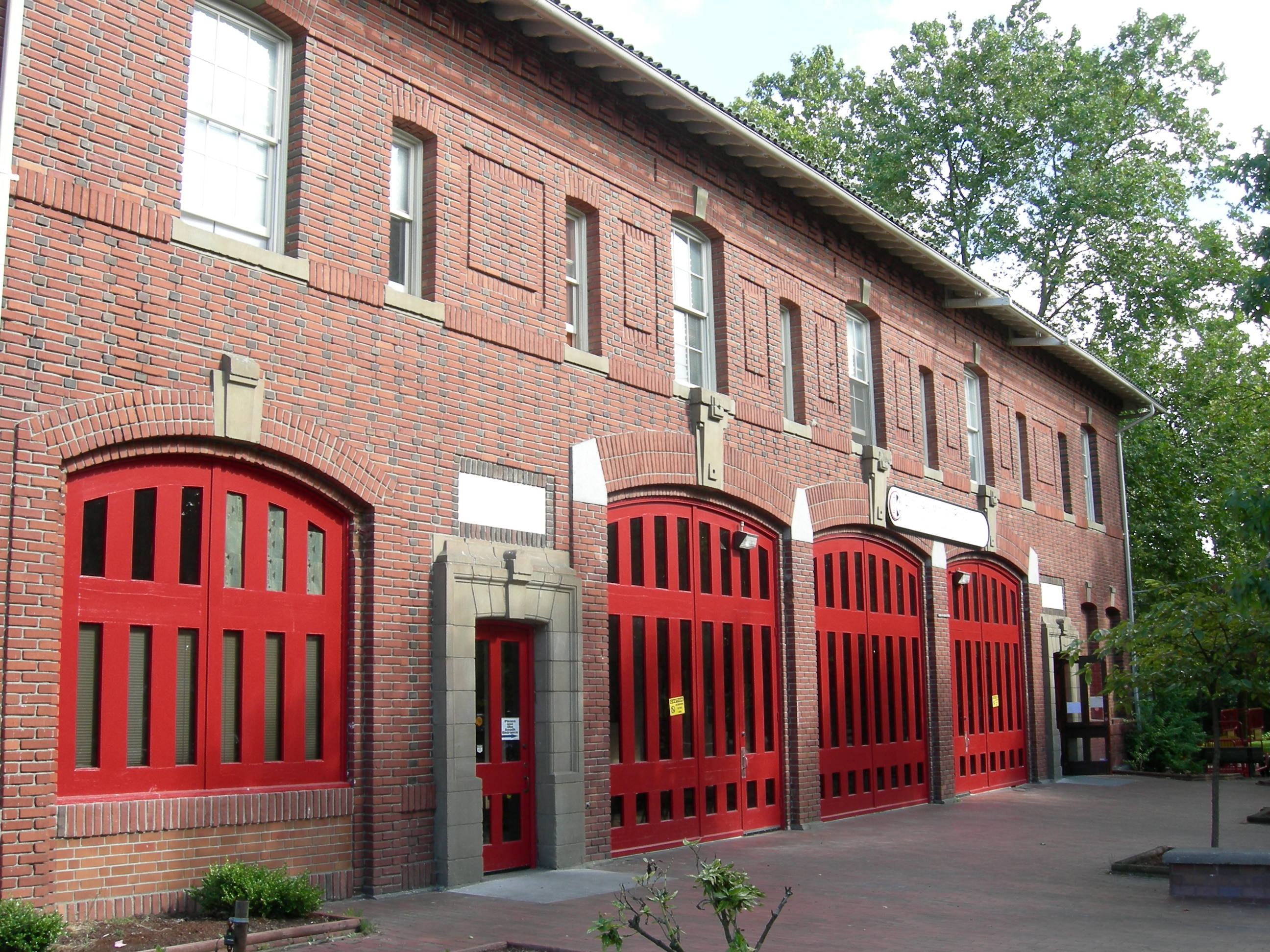
- The former Fire Station No. 23, 2007

- Location within Washington (state)
- Location: 18th Ave. and Columbia St., Seattle, Washington
- Coordinates: 47°36′32″N 122°18′26″W
- Area: less than one acre
- Built: 1909
- Architect: Everett & Baker
- NRHP reference No.: 71000874
- Added to NRHP: September 10, 1971

Fire Station No. 23 is a former fire station located in the Central District of Seattle, Washington listed on the National Register of Historic Places. It was remodeled as the Cherry Hill Community Center in 1970, and served as the headquarters of Centerstone (formerly the Central Area Motivational Program, or CAMP). It was again renamed in 2018 to Byrd Barr Place. This was done to honor local US civil rights leader Roberta Byrd Barr, who is cited as strong supporter of CAMP's efforts since the 1960s. The location currently offers community support to the surrounding Seattle area, including housing assistance, tackling food insecurity, and bringing the community together to advocate for its needs. Byrd Barr Place seeks to support Black Washington residents within Seattle's Central District in particular, with the end goal of bettering the state of Washington collectively.

== Historical Context ==
Despite being included within the National Register of Historic Places, Fire Station No. 23 was built in 1909 without a specific architectural style being used by firm Everett & Baker. The station featured several different companies within its stationed battalion, including the steam based Engine Company No. 23, Hose Company No. 23, and Ladder Company No. 23. Within the structure, the fire battalion's headquarters were established. The station was made up of three equipment bays downstairs, as well as a dormitory and offices upstairs. A five-story hose tower was built in addition. The stationed battalion served the area between the Seattle ship canal and the Rainier Valley. The Ladder Company of the station became motorized in 1918 following the introduction of the automobile, with the horses of the Engine Company being retired in 1922.

Following the remodeling of the station in 1970 to the Cherry Hill Community Center, the interior was remodeled into offices and a dance studio. In order to maintain the traditional look of the structure, the equipment bays would be sealed over with a wood window wall to resemble to original doors. These remodels were led by Seattle Architect Ted Bowers. Seattle landscape architect Richard Haag developed the neighboring Firehouse Park in 1968. After the submission of a prepared form by the Seattle Historical Society in 1969, the National Register would recognize Fire Station No. 23 as part of its Register of Historic Places in 1971. Within the nomination form provided to the National Register, the Seattle Historical Society cited several factors which warrant Fire Station No. 23's placement into the National Register of Historic Places. Most notably, the fire station is one of the earlier municipal buildings within Seattle to be designed by architects. It is believed to serve as a reminder of the horse-drawn era of fire fighting while exhibiting a signature architectural contribution to the neighborhood around it.

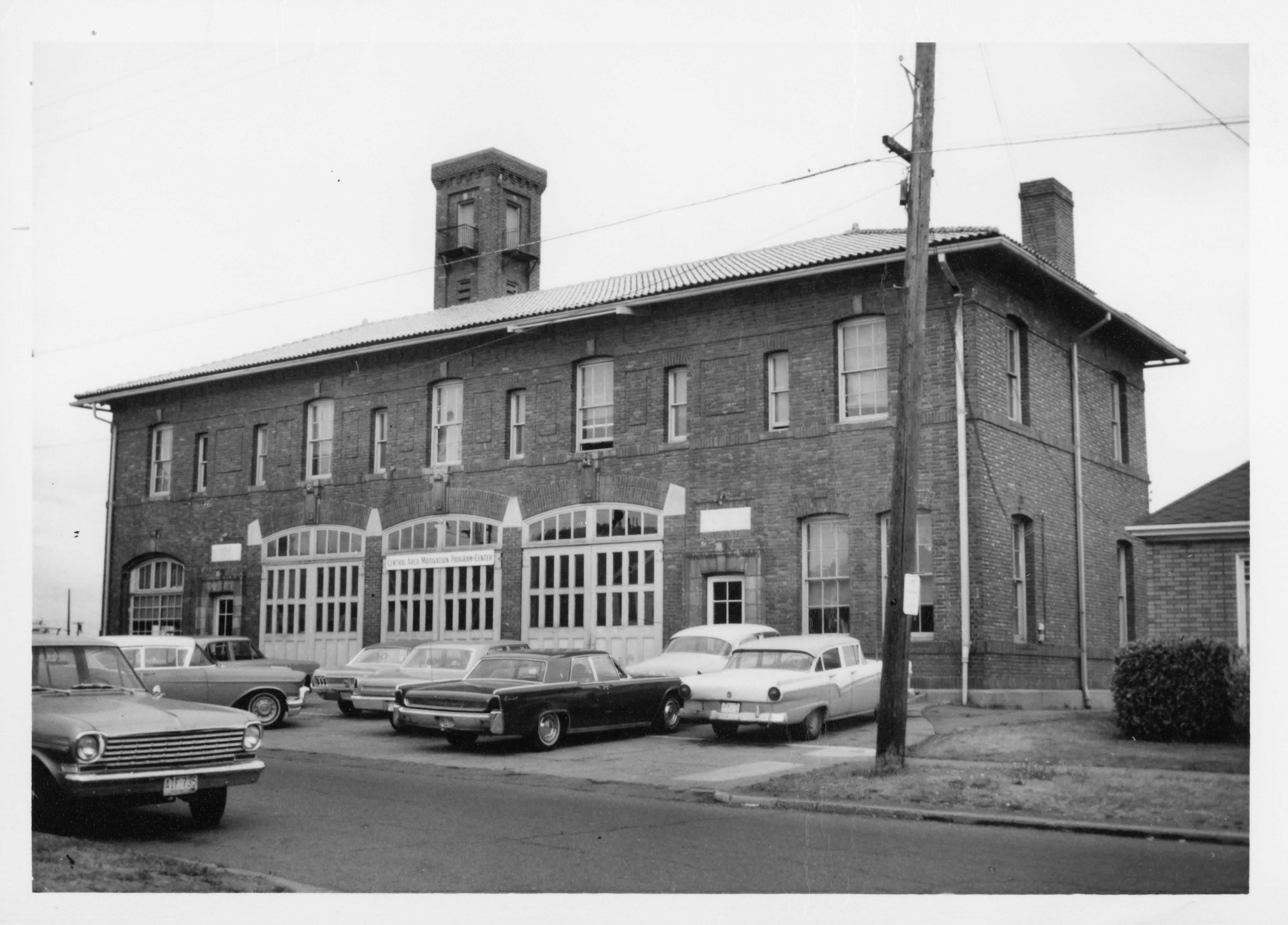
Central Area Motivational Program operating out of the former Fire Station No. 23, 1969.

== See also ==
- List of landmarks in Seattle
- List of National Historic Landmarks in Washington (state)
- National Register of Historic Places listings in Seattle
