= Mount Clark (Washington) =

Mountain in Washington (state), United States

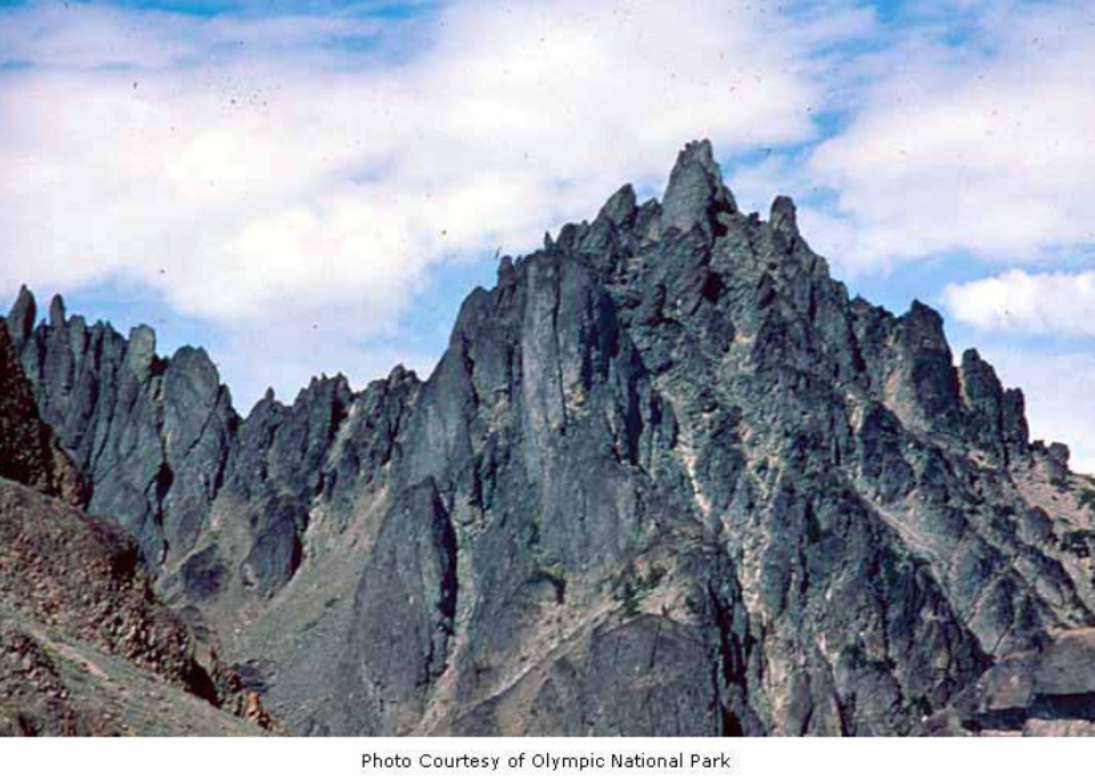

Highest point
- Elevation: 7,528 ft (2,295 m)
- Prominence: 608 ft (185 m)
- Parent peak: Mount Johnson
- Isolation: 0.33 mi (0.53 km)
- Coordinates: 47°50′08″N 123°13′54″W

Geography
- Location within Washington (state) Location within the United States
- Country: United States
- State: Washington
- County: Jefferson
- Protected area: Olympic National Park
- Parent range: Olympic Mountains
- Topo map: USGS Mount Deception

Geology
- Rock age: Eocene
- Rock type: basalt

Climbing
- Easiest route: class 3 scrambling

Mount Clark is a 7,528-foot (2,295-metre) mountain summit located within Olympic National Park in Jefferson County of Washington state. Its nearest higher peak is Sweat Spire (7,580 ft) on Mount Johnson, 0.26 mi (0.42 km) to the southwest, and Mount Walkinshaw is set 0.9 mi (1.4 km) to the north. It is the second highest peak in The Needles range, which is a subrange of the Olympic Mountains, and seventh highest in the Olympic Mountains. The climbing routes on Mt. Clark start at Class 3 scrambling and range up to Class 5.5 via the central South Face. Precipitation runoff from the mountain drains into tributaries of the Dungeness River.

== History ==
The first ascent of the mountain was made on August 21, 1940, by George R. Martin and Elvin Johnson who dubbed the peak Mt. Belvedere.

The mountain was officially named in 1965 to honor Irving M. Clark (1882-1960), a Seattle conservationist and leader in the establishment of Olympic National Park.

== Climate ==
Based on the Köppen climate classification, Mount Clark is located in the marine west coast climate zone of western North America. Weather fronts originating in the Pacific Ocean travel northeast toward the Olympic Mountains. As fronts approach, they are forced upward by the peaks (orographic lift), causing them to drop their moisture in the form of rain or snow. As a result, the Olympics experience high precipitation, especially during the winter months in the form of snowfall. Because of maritime influence, snow tends to be wet and heavy, resulting in avalanche danger. During winter months weather is usually cloudy, but due to high pressure systems over the Pacific Ocean that intensify during summer months, there is often little or no cloud cover during the summer. The months of July through September offer the most favorable weather for climbing.

== Gallery ==
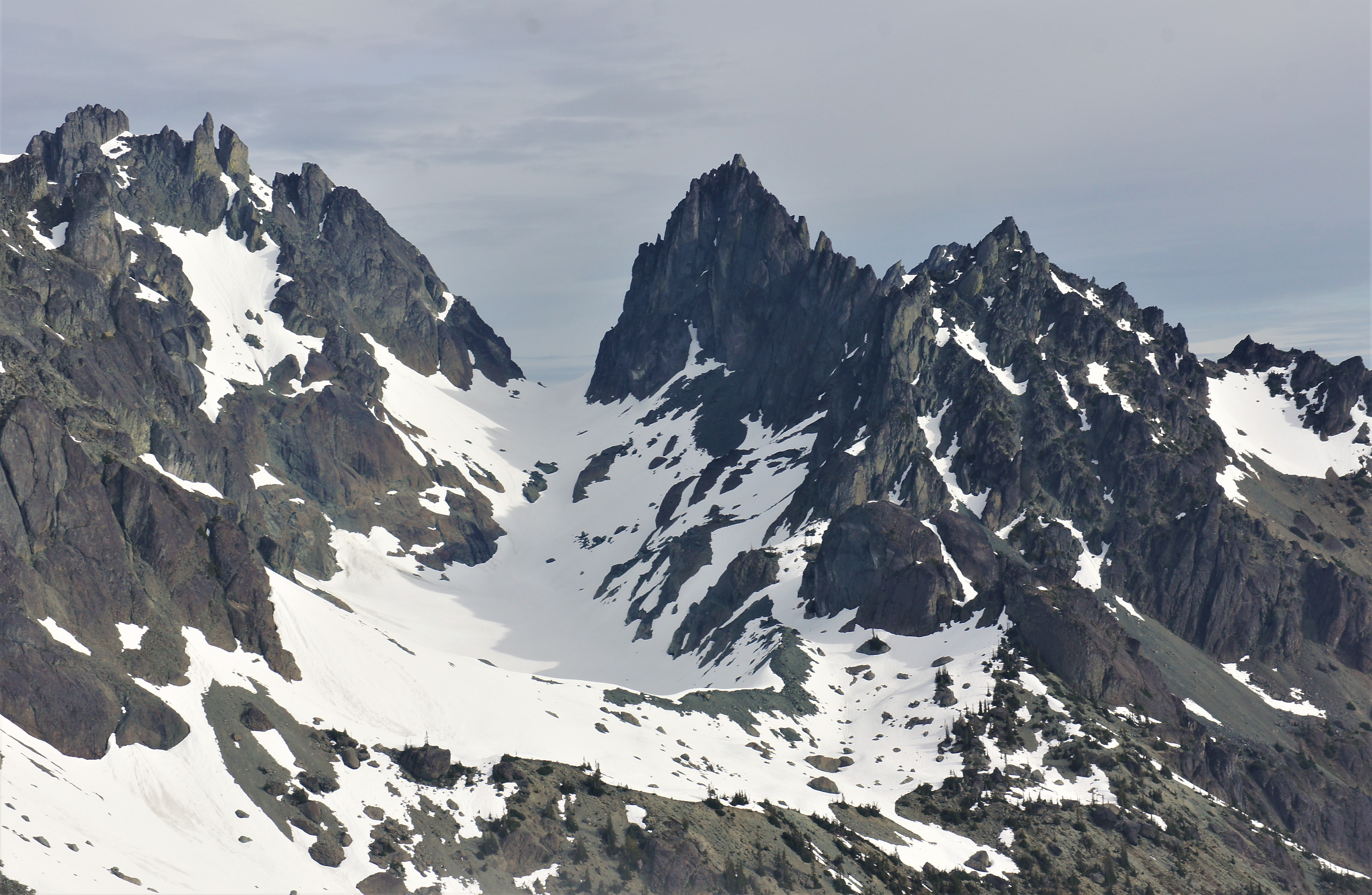
Mount Clark centered, with Sweat Spire and Mt. Johnson (left)

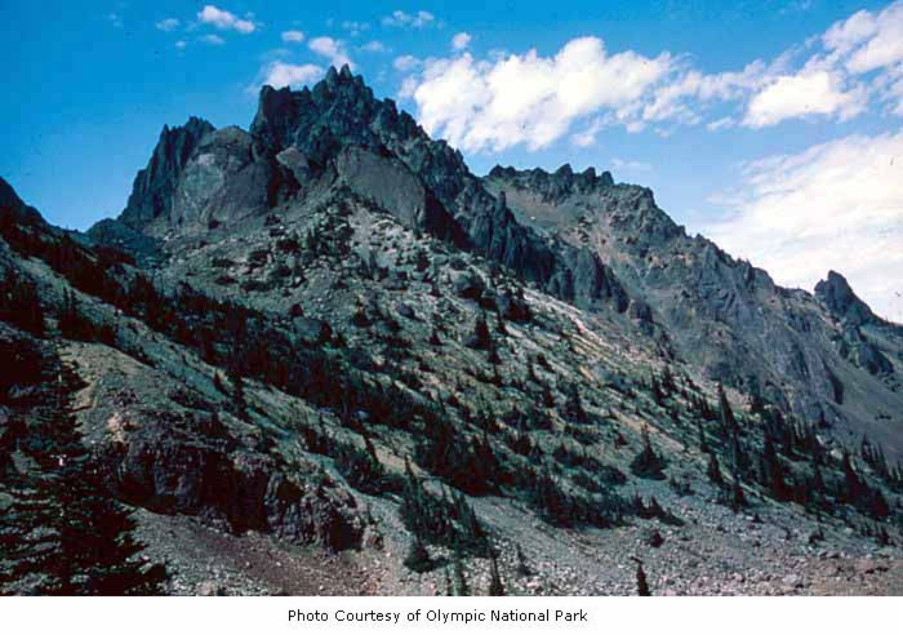
The Needles and Mount Clark

== See also ==
- Adelaide Peak
- Sundial (Olympic Mountains)
- Geology of the Pacific Northwest
