= Walter Walkinshaw =

American lawyer

Walt Walkinshaw
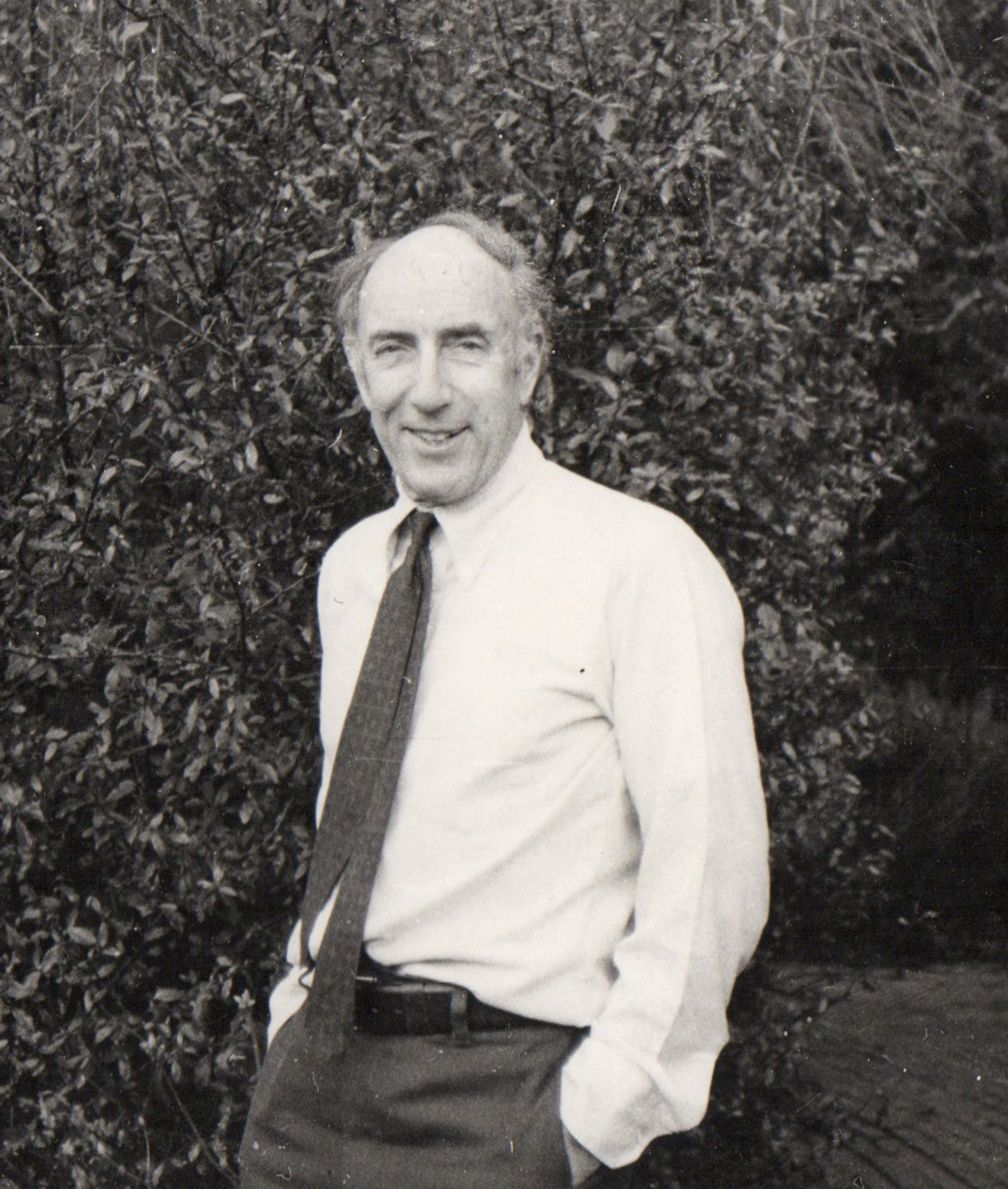
- Born: 1917; Seattle, Washington, U.S.
- Died: April 16, 2010 (aged 93); Seattle, Washington, U.S.
- Occupation: Lawyer
- Spouse: Jean Walkinshaw (m. 1952)

Walter Walkinshaw (1917 – April 16, 2010) was an American attorney.

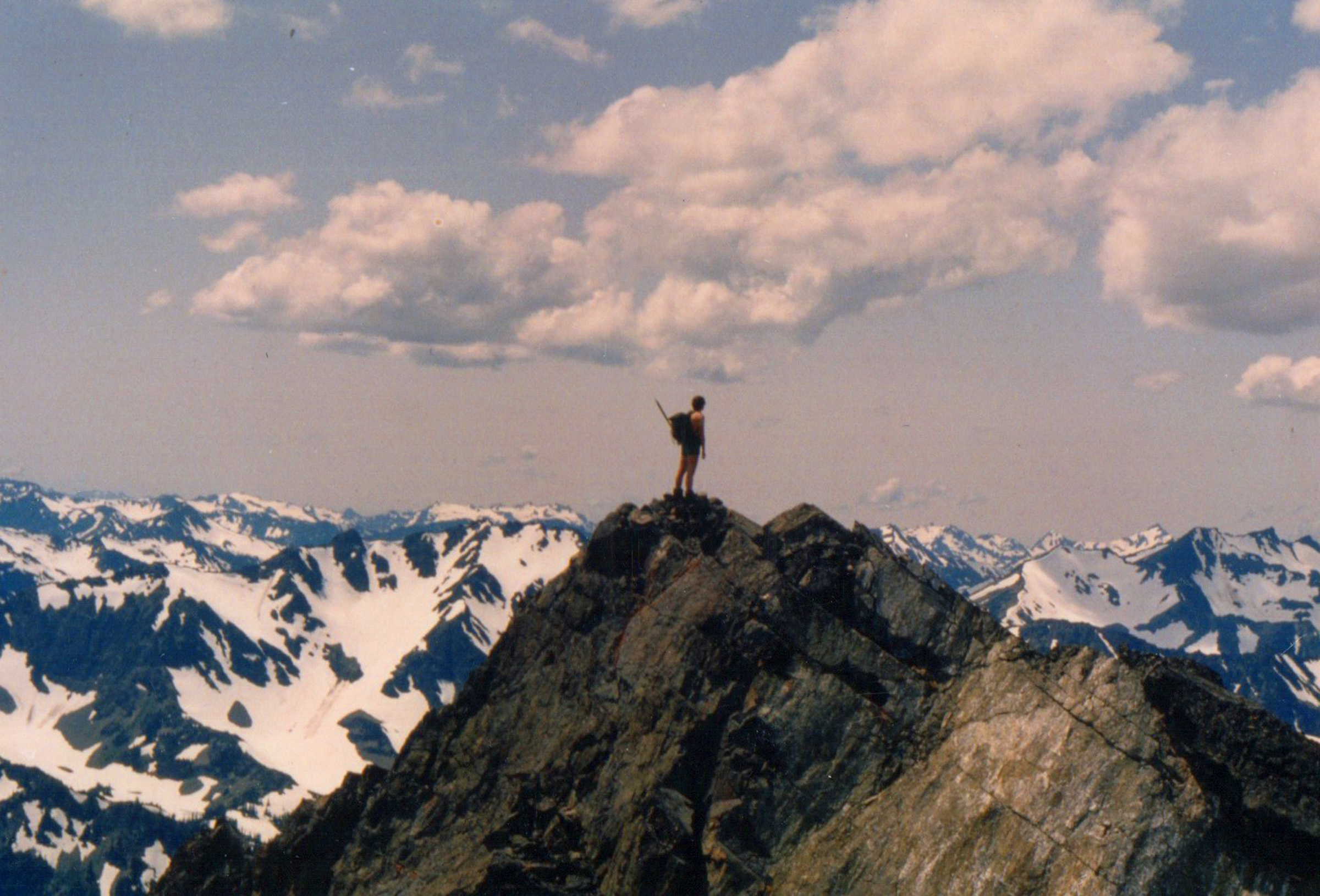
Walt on top of Mt. Walkinshaw

Walkinshaw was born in 1917 in Seattle into a pioneering family – Mount Walkinshaw in the Olympic Mountains is named after his father Robert B. Walkinshaw, an author and lawyer.

After graduating from the University of Washington in 1939, he was chosen as one of 40 young Rockefeller Foundation interns in the federal government in Washington, D.C. He worked in various departments and ended up as a staff member in the executive office of President Franklin D. Roosevelt where he wrote reports on the various new agencies of the New Deal.

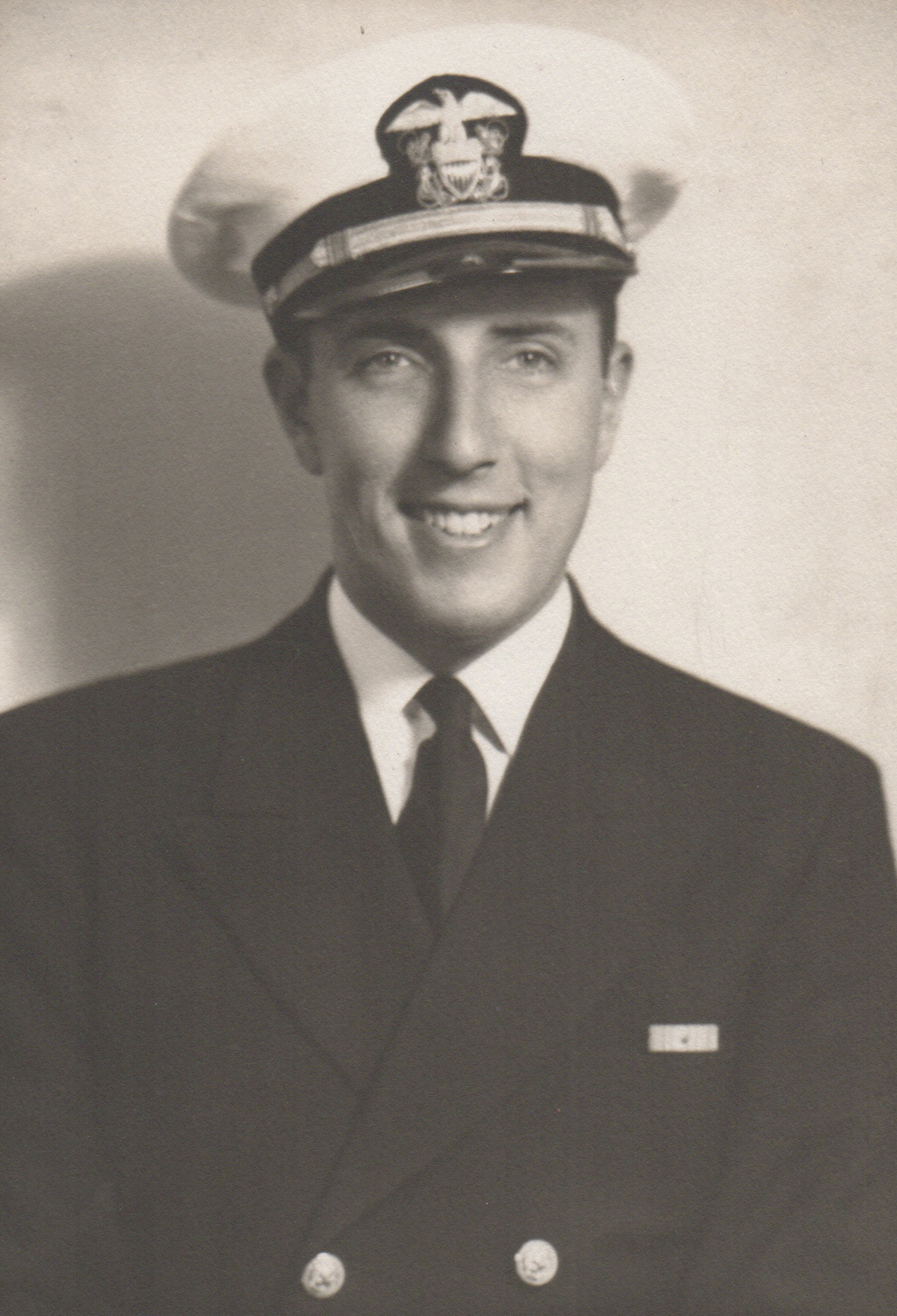
Navy navigator of escort aircraft carrier in World War II

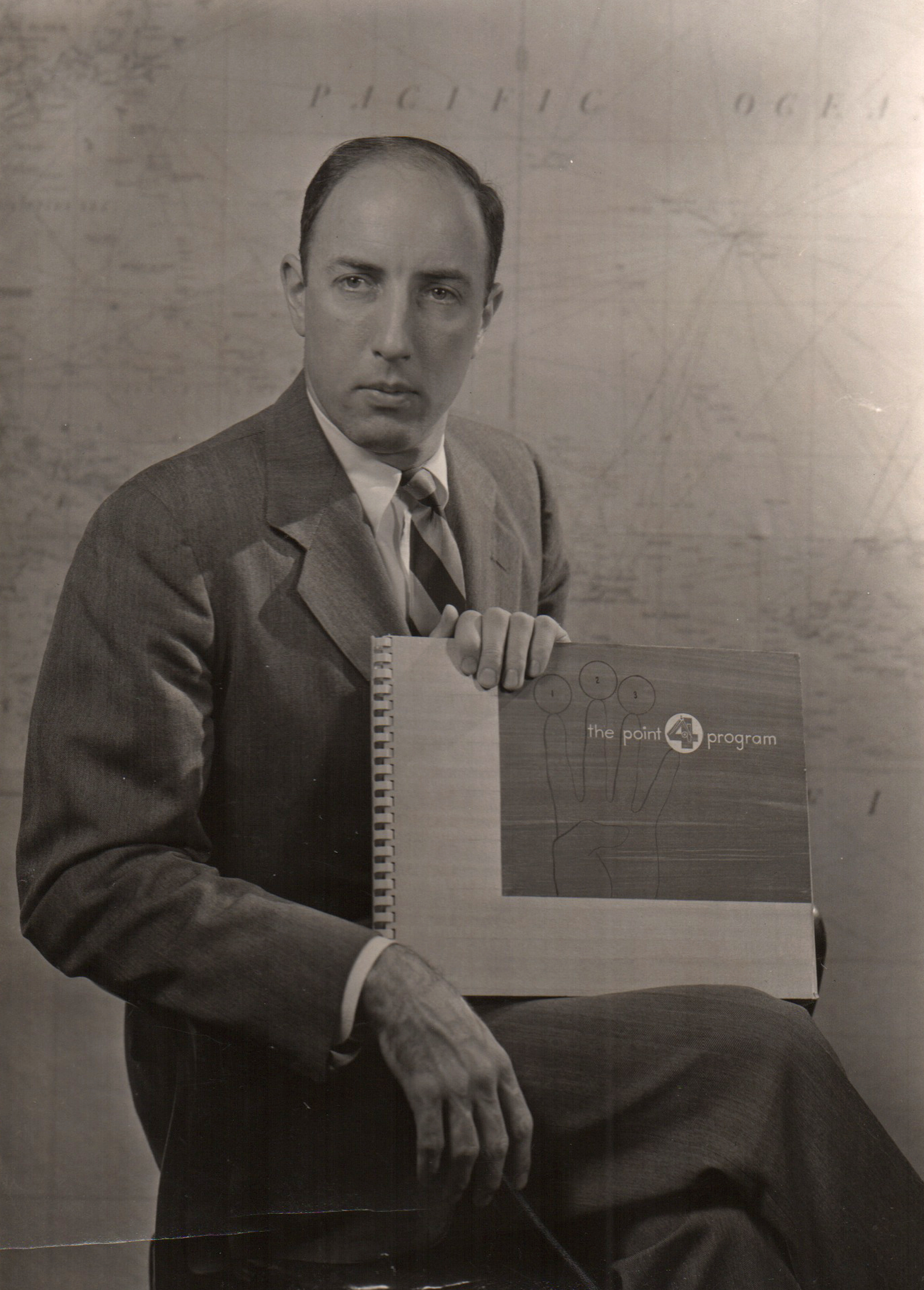
U.S. Department of State spokesman for Point Four

Walkinshaw's career was interrupted by World War II. He served in the Navy for five years. He started in the North Atlantic as a deck officer on a cargo ship dodging German submarines. He participated in the battles of Saipan, Iwo Jima, and Okinawa. He also received a "special commendation for performance duty in operations" against Iwo Jima. When he was navigator of aircraft carrier USS Windham Bay, his ship was in the first assault of that island. Walt retired in 1946 as a commander.

He then became a program analyst and foreign affairs specialist with the U.S. government's Interdepartmental Committee on Scientific and Cultural Cooperation. In this job, he worked with a program of technical aid and exchange of scientific knowledge with South America. In the Mundt bill (P.L. 402), the program was approvedby Congress to go worldwide, but no funding was provided.

In 1950, Walkinshaw was a representative of the United States Department of State on the Griffin Mission that went to Southeast Asia to establish Point Four. The idea of using younger people for overseas technical work was suggested in his final report for the Griffin Mission, and furthered by Lloyd Andrews who became head of Point Four. Andrews later had direct input when President John F. Kennedy founded the Peace Corps. Point Four also laid the foundation for what would later become USAID, the U.S. Agency for International Development.

After leaving the State Department, Walkinshaw started his new law practice in Seattle and was a lone practitioner for 21 years before joining Riddell Williams law firm.

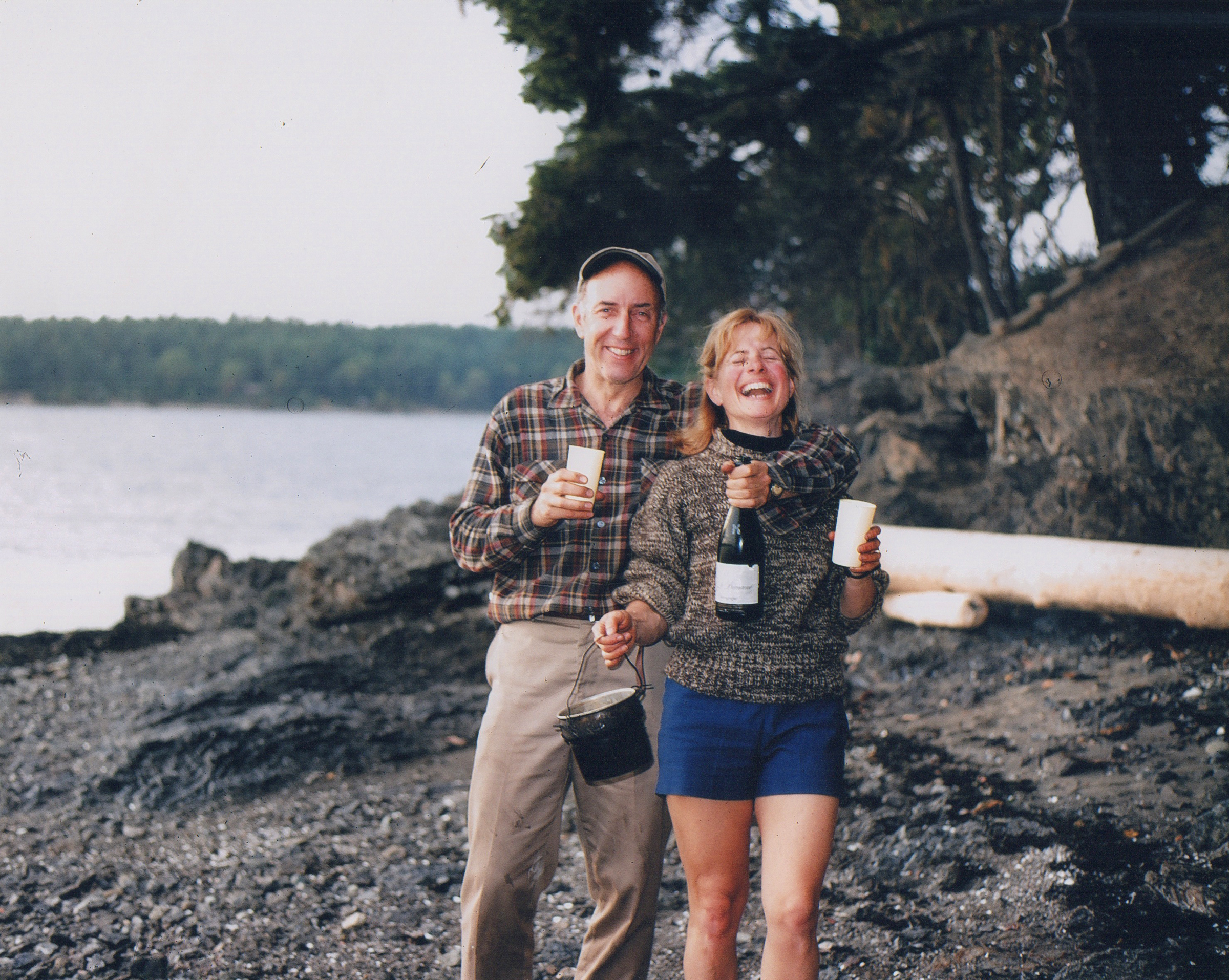
Jean and Walt at San Juan retreat

Not long after moving back to Seattle, he met his future wife Jean Strong at a Quaker meeting. Jean was a graduate of Stanford University and had just returned from Hiroshima, where she worked to build houses of good will. They soon married and had three children: Charlie, Rob and Meg.

Walkinshaw's wife Jean Walkinshaw's father was a civil engineer who built roads including the North Cascades Highway to Marblemount and a portion of the road around the Olympic Peninsula. Mount Henderson in the Olympic Mountains is named after her grandfather. Jean became a documentary producer and produced for The History Channel; KING-TV, NBC affiliate in Seattle; and KCTS, the public television station in Seattle. She produced more than 50 documentaries. In 1992 she was inducted into the National Academy of Television Arts and Sciences Silver Circle for 25 years of significant contribution to the television industry and community.

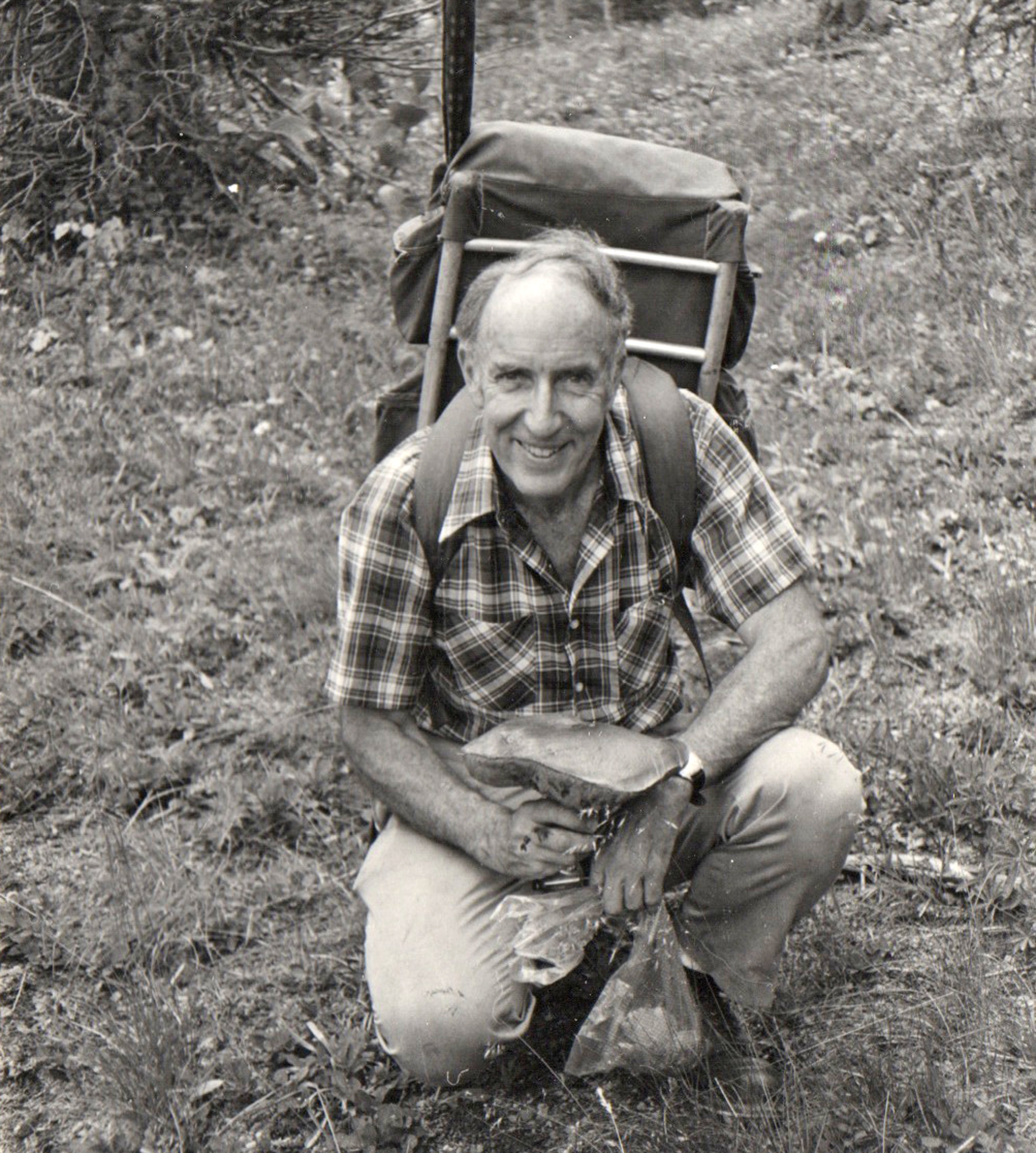
Walt, the environmentalist

Walkinshaw died in Seattle on April 16, 2010, at age 93.
