= Roberta Byrd Barr =

African American educator, civil rights leader, librarian, and television personality

- Barr in 1966
- Born: January 4, 1919; Tacoma, Washington, US
- Died: June 23, 1993 (aged 74)
- Education: Wilberforce University; University of Washington
- Occupations: Educator, librarian, television presenter

Roberta Byrd Barr (January 4, 1919 – June 23, 1993) was an American civil rights activist, television personality, educator, and librarian. From the mid-1960s to the early 1970s, she hosted a weekly Seattle television show, Face to Face, which featured guest speakers discussing issues such as race, education, and welfare. In 1973 she became the first woman principal of a high school in Seattle.

== Early life and education ==
Roberta Spencer was born in Tacoma, Washington on January 4, 1919.

She attended Lincoln High School and Wilberforce University. She also attended the New School of Social Research. She later earned a bachelor's degree in sociology and elementary education as well as a master's degree in librarianship from the University of Washington.

== Career as educator and librarian ==
Barr worked as a teacher and librarian in a number of schools within Seattle. During the Seattle school boycott of 1966, she headed one of the Freedom Schools that were set up in protest of the lack of progress towards desegregation. That same year, she was appointed to the Washington State Board Against Discrimination.

She was appointed vice principal of Franklin High School in 1968, after 150 students held a sit-in protesting the expulsion of black female students who chose to wear their hair in a natural style. In 1973 Barr became the principal of Lincoln High School, becoming both the first woman and the first African American to be a principal in the Seattle Public Schools district.

== Career in acting and television ==
Barr's career in acting began when she starred in a Cirque Theatre production of A Raisin in the Sun alongside Greg Morris. She hosted a KCTS-TV show named Let's Imagine where she told stories for young children.

She moderated an audience participation show called Face to Face on KING-TV from 1965 to 1970 and on KCTS from 1971 to 1972. Barr interviewed people who were considered too radical for other television shows, including Cesar Chavez. The show's producer, Jean Walkinshaw, described Barr as waking "up the community to all kinds of things that had been overlooked."

== Legacy ==
Seattle advocacy organization Byrd Barr Place (originally Central Area Motivation Program housed within the historic Seattle Fire Station No. 23) was renamed in 2018 to honor Barr, who was at one time a writer for the group's monthly newsletter; the organization focuses on improving the lives of low-income people throughout Washington State.

Barr's photo hangs in the Douglass-Truth Branch of the Seattle Public Library to honor her efforts to promote the development of the library's African-American Collection.
