= Jean Walkinshaw =

American television producer (1926–2026)

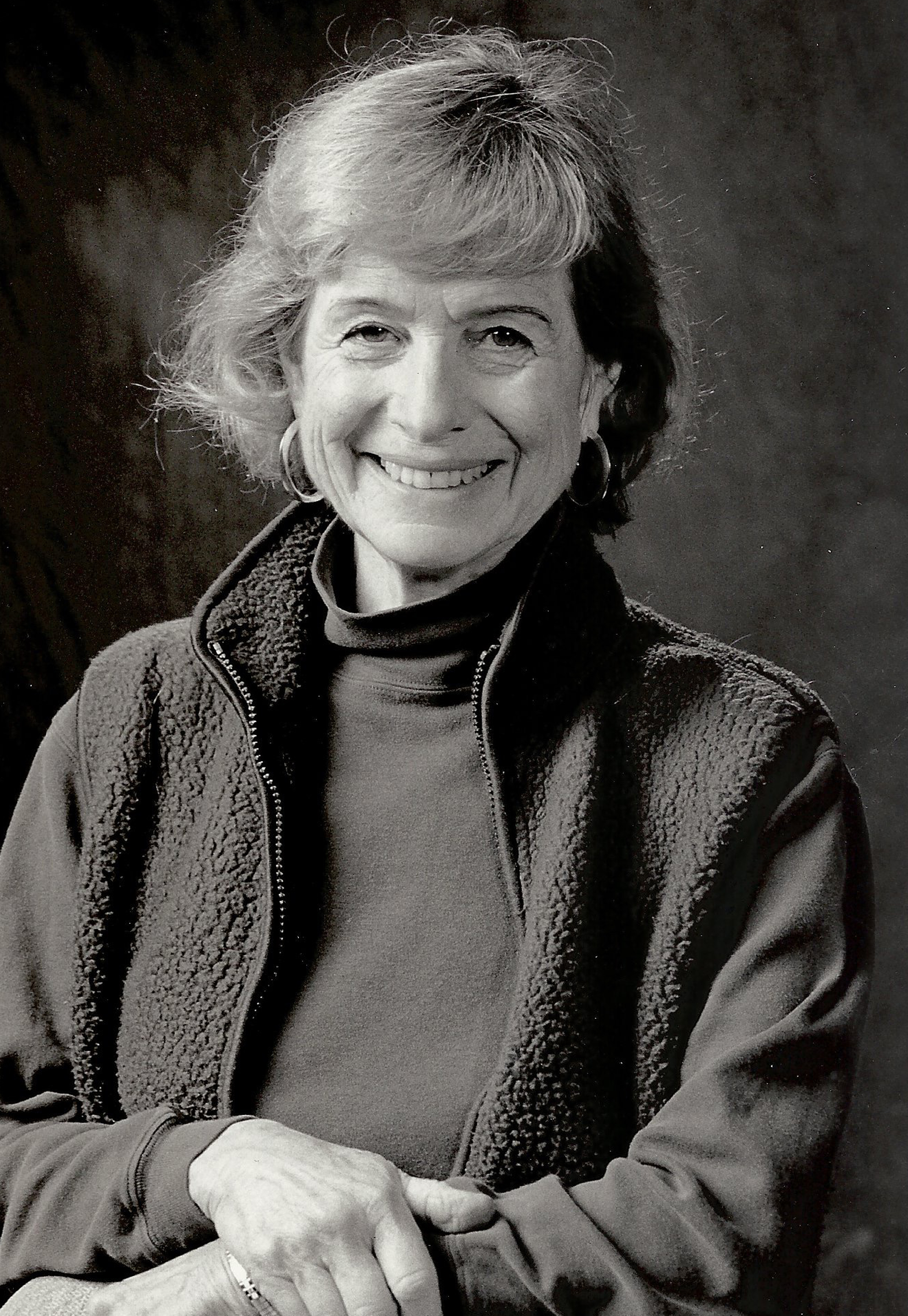
- Born: July 23, 1926; Tacoma, Washington, U.S.
- Died: April 13, 2026 (aged 99)
- Education: Stanford University
- Occupation: Television producer
- Spouse: Walter Walkinshaw (m. 1952; died 2010)
- Children: 3

Jean Walkinshaw (née Strong; July 23, 1926 – April 13, 2026) was an American television producer. She produced content for The History Channel, KING-TV, and KCTS (Cascade PBS). In 2019 Walkinshaw was inducted into the Northwest Chapter of the National Academy of Television Arts and Sciences Gold Circle for 50 years of significant contribution to the television industry and community.

== Early life and career ==
Jean Strong was born in Tacoma, Washington, on July 23, 1926. A graduate of Stanford University, she taught school for three years and in 1963 started her TV career. At KING-TV she produced a weekly series, Face to Face, hosted by Roberta Byrd Barr, which in 1968 was the only local program series in the U.S. to consistently report on attitudes of minority peoples.

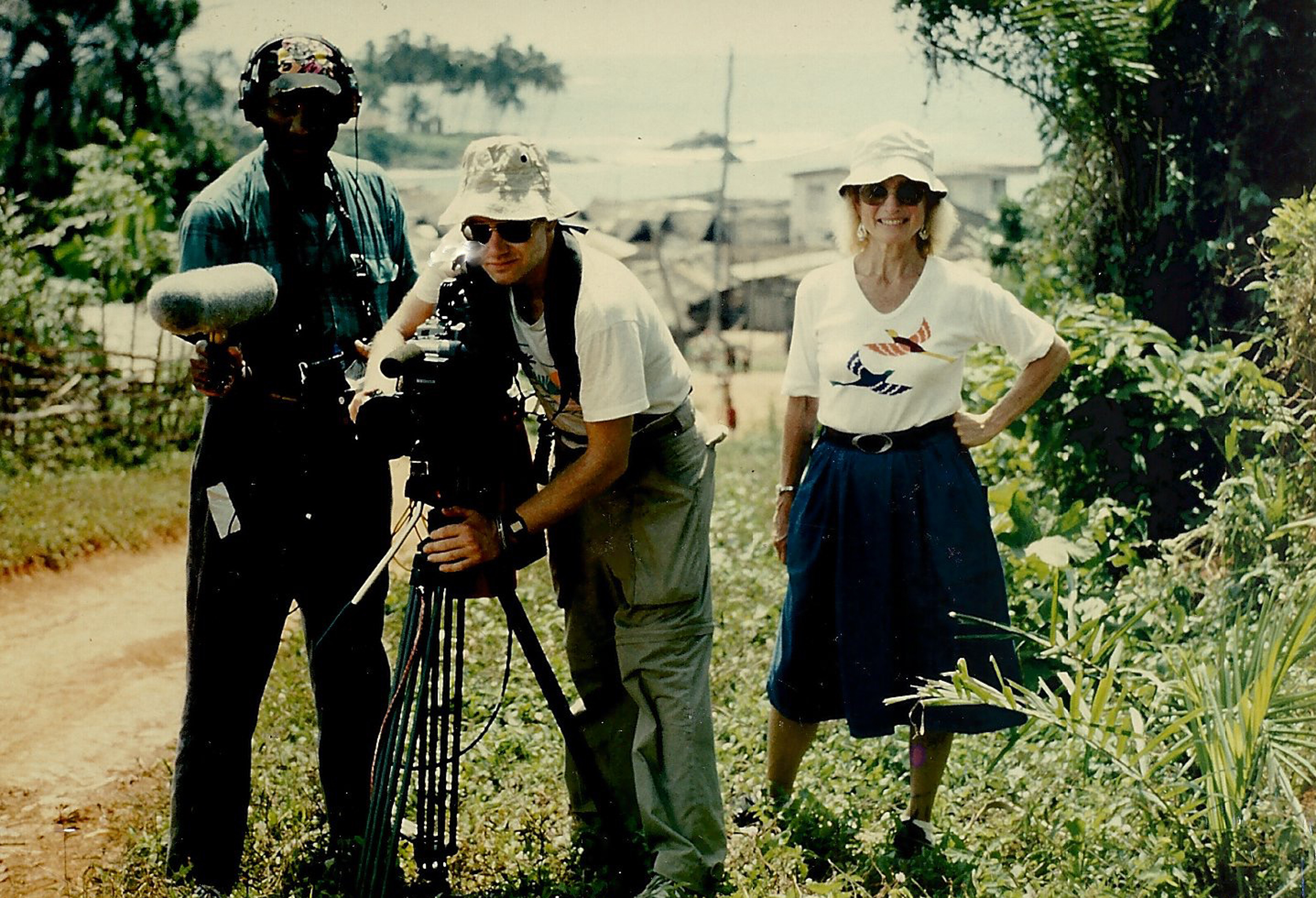
Producing "In the Spirit of Cooperation" in Ghana, West Africa

In 1970 Walkinshaw moved to KCTS where she produced documentaries for both national and local audiences. Much of her work features people and places in the Northwest, but she also produced documentaries in Russia, Ghana and four in Japan. Walkinshaw's production team was the first from the Northwest allowed to film in the USSR. Many of her programs have been aired nationally by PBS and such varied groups as NHK in Japan, Super Channel in Europe, British Airways, and Armed Forces Television Services. Her production of Rainier: The Mountain helped inaugurate high definition television in the Northwest.

Walkinshaw contributed production content to the American Archive of Public Broadcasting (AAPB) . In May 2021, the AAPB launched the Jean Walkinshaw Collection featuring national and international documentaries and raw interviews produced by Walkinshaw for the Seattle public television station KCTS and SCCtv (Seattle Colleges Cable Television).

== Conservationism and activism ==
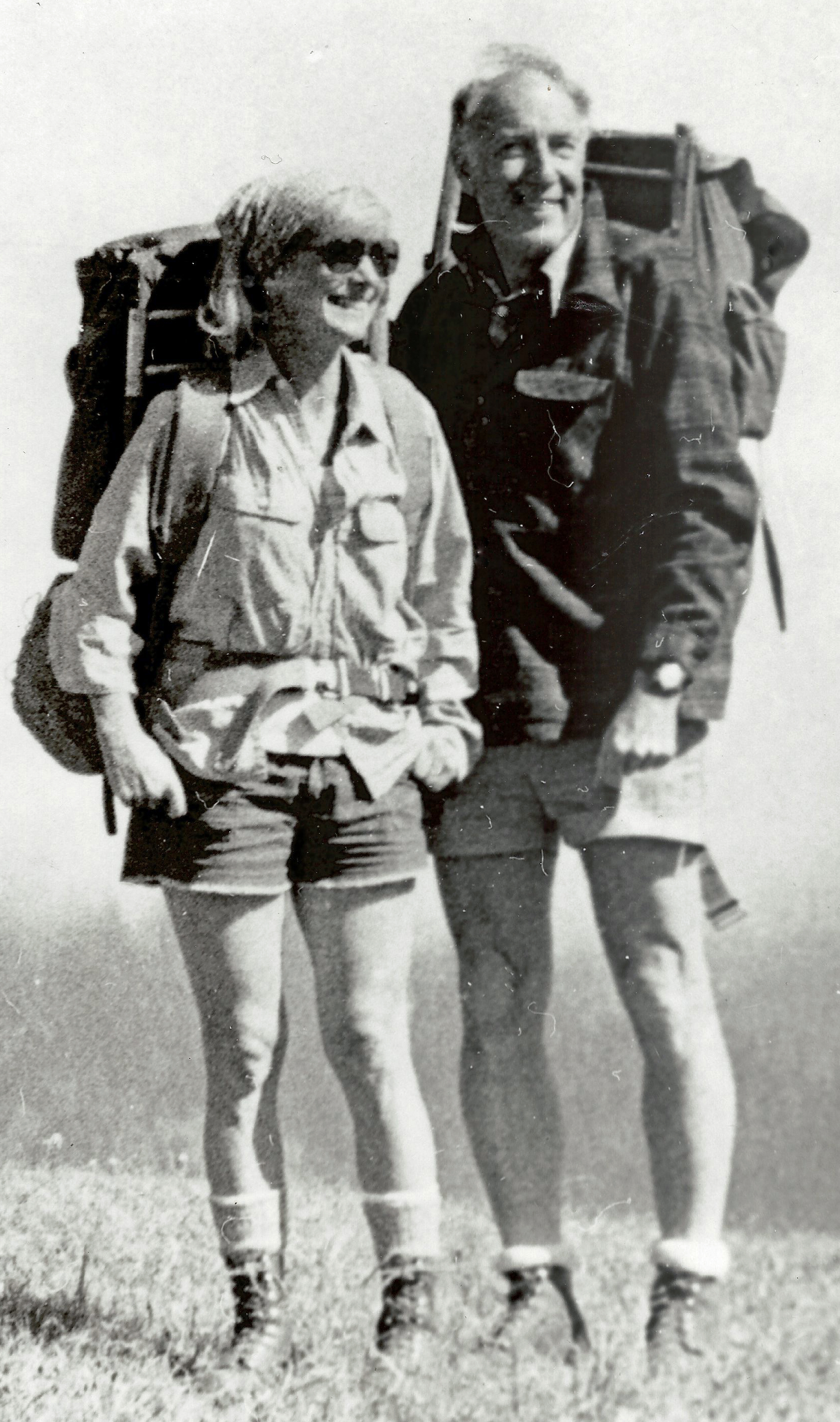
Jean and Walt share their passion for the mountains

She married Walter Walkinshaw, a conservationist and outdoorsman. The Olympic Mountains have two peaks that reflect her deep heritage. Mount Walkinshaw was named after her father-in-law Robert Walkinshaw, an early member of the Mountaineers. Mount Henderson was named after her grandfather Louis F. Henderson, the first botanist to name flowers in the Olympic Mountains.

In addition to being a documentary producer, Walkinshaw was an activist. She built houses of good will in Hiroshima in 1951 after the atomic bomb. Walkinshaw was chairman of the School Affiliation Committee of the American Friends. This committee enabled the first American high school students in the nation to live and study in Japan. She and her husband helped found the Seattle chapter of Amigos de las Americas, a program which at that time sent young people to give vaccinations and basic first aid in remote villages. For four years she chaired the Washington State Selection Committee to choose Rhodes Scholars. She served on a number of cultural and community boards in Seattle.

In 2010 Joel Connelly, national correspondent for the Seattle P-I, wrote that Walkinshaw and her husband were "one of Seattle’s most achieving couples."

== Personal life and death ==
In 1952 she married Walt Walkinshaw. They were together until his death in 2010, and had three children: two sons and a daughter. She died on April 13, 2026, at the age of 99.

== Awards and reviews ==
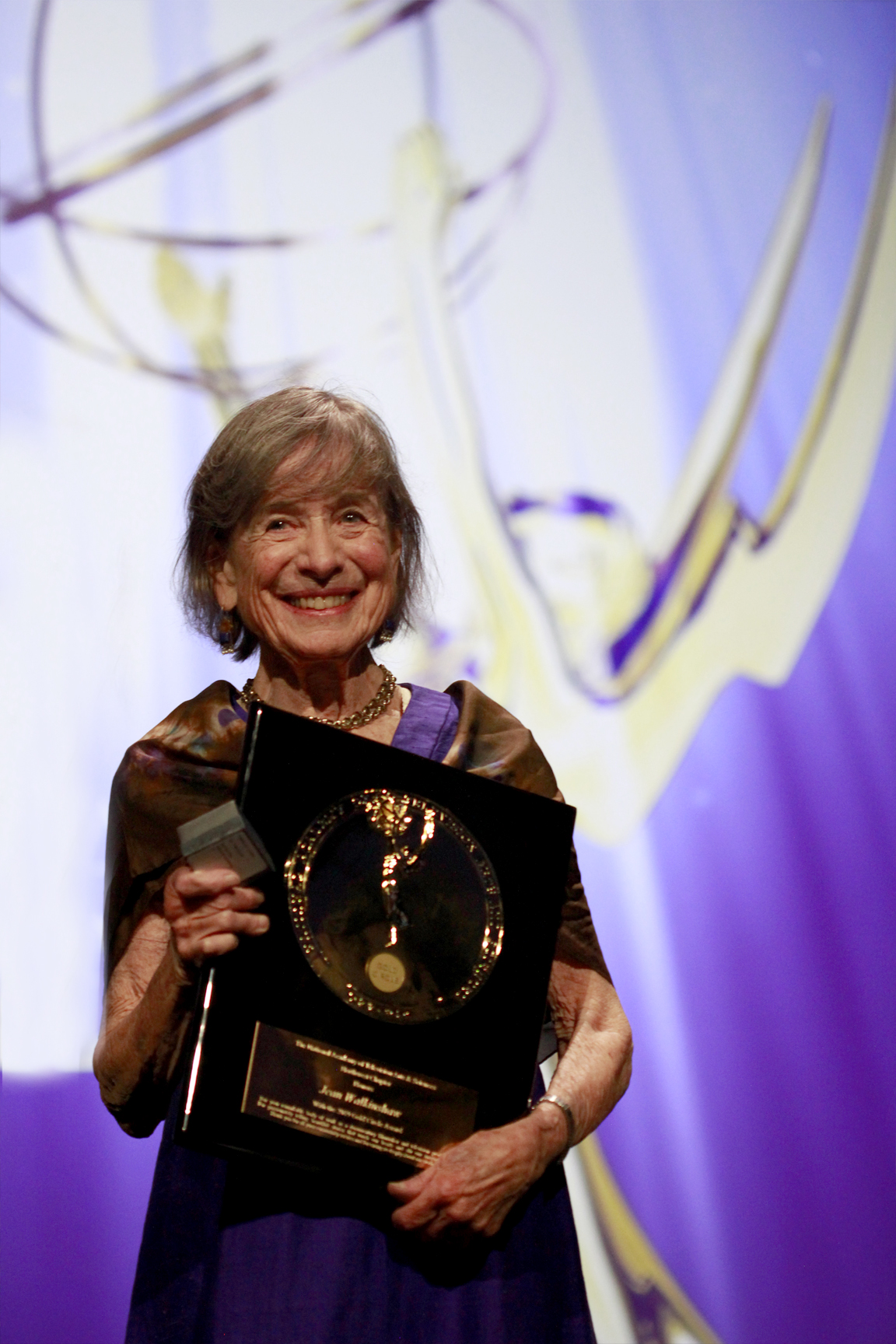
Walkinshaw was inducted into the 2019 Gold Circle (Photo: Lisa Sairy)

Her awards include eight Northwest Regional Emmys, Robert F. Kennedy Journalism Award, Ohio State Award, National Press Women Award; New York Festival International TV Program Award, Chicago International Film Festival Award, two American Film and Video Festival Awards, six Best of the West Awards, Religious Broadcasting Award, and the Corporation for Public Broadcasting Award. Walkinshaw received the first Spirit of Nell Award given by Women in Film/Seattle. She was the first woman producer inducted into the Northwest Chapter of the National Academy of Television Arts and Sciences Silver Circle.

== Select documentaries ==
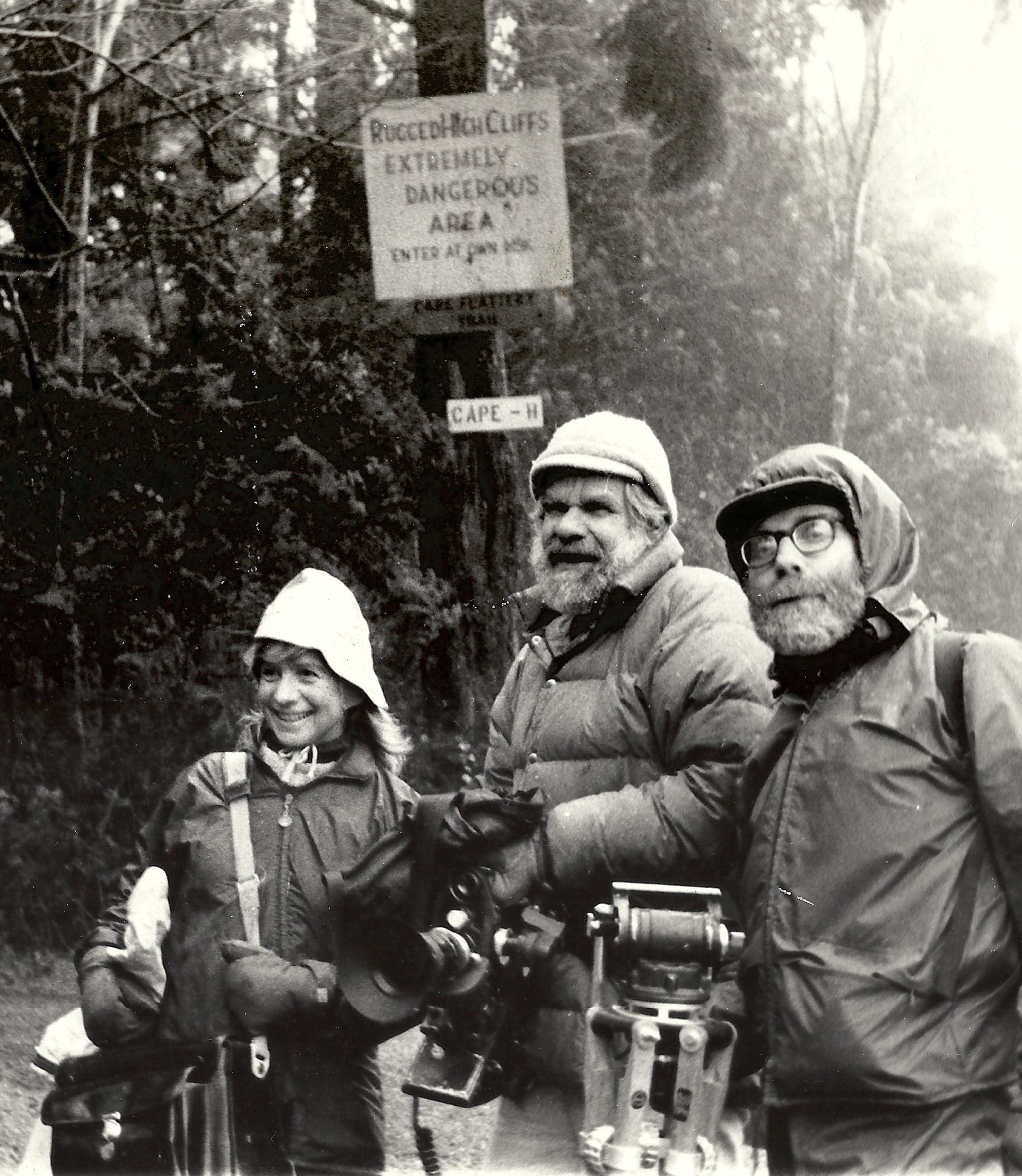
Shooting "Winter Brothers" in the rain with author Ivan Doig

- Three Artists in the Northwest – Portrait of three prominent Northwest artists: painters George Tsutakawa and Guy Anderson, and poet Theodore Roethke.
- Young Storytellers in Russia – One of the first American cultural documentaries taped in the former USSR.
- In the Shadow of the Mountains – Profile of Northwest mountain-climber Jim Wickwire.
- Kitaro – Japanese composer and keyboard musician Kitaro in his first tour of the U.S.
- In the Spirit of Cooperation – Japanese Overseas Cooperation Volunteers (JOCV) and American Peace Corps volunteers in Ghana, West Africa.
- Children of the Homeless – Children’s experiences from their perspective.
- To Write and Keep Kind – Profile of writer Raymond Carver.
- Remarkable People: Making a Difference in the Northwest – Series of half-hour profiles featuring extraordinary people.
- WestWords – Vibrant portraits of six Western writer and the region that inspires their work. Featured are: Ivan Doig, Maxine Hong Kingston, Tony Hillerman, Terry Tempest Williams, William Kittredge, and Rudolfo Anaya.
- The River – Follows the Columbia River and some of its inhabitants from the headwaters in Canada to the Pacific Ocean.
- Tom Robbins: A Writer in the Rain – About the life and writing of this popular author.
- Rainier: The Mountain – Celebrating the mountain, its legends, and the founding of Mount Rainier National Park 100 years before.
