= Mount Walkinshaw =

Mountain in Washington, USA

- The Citadel
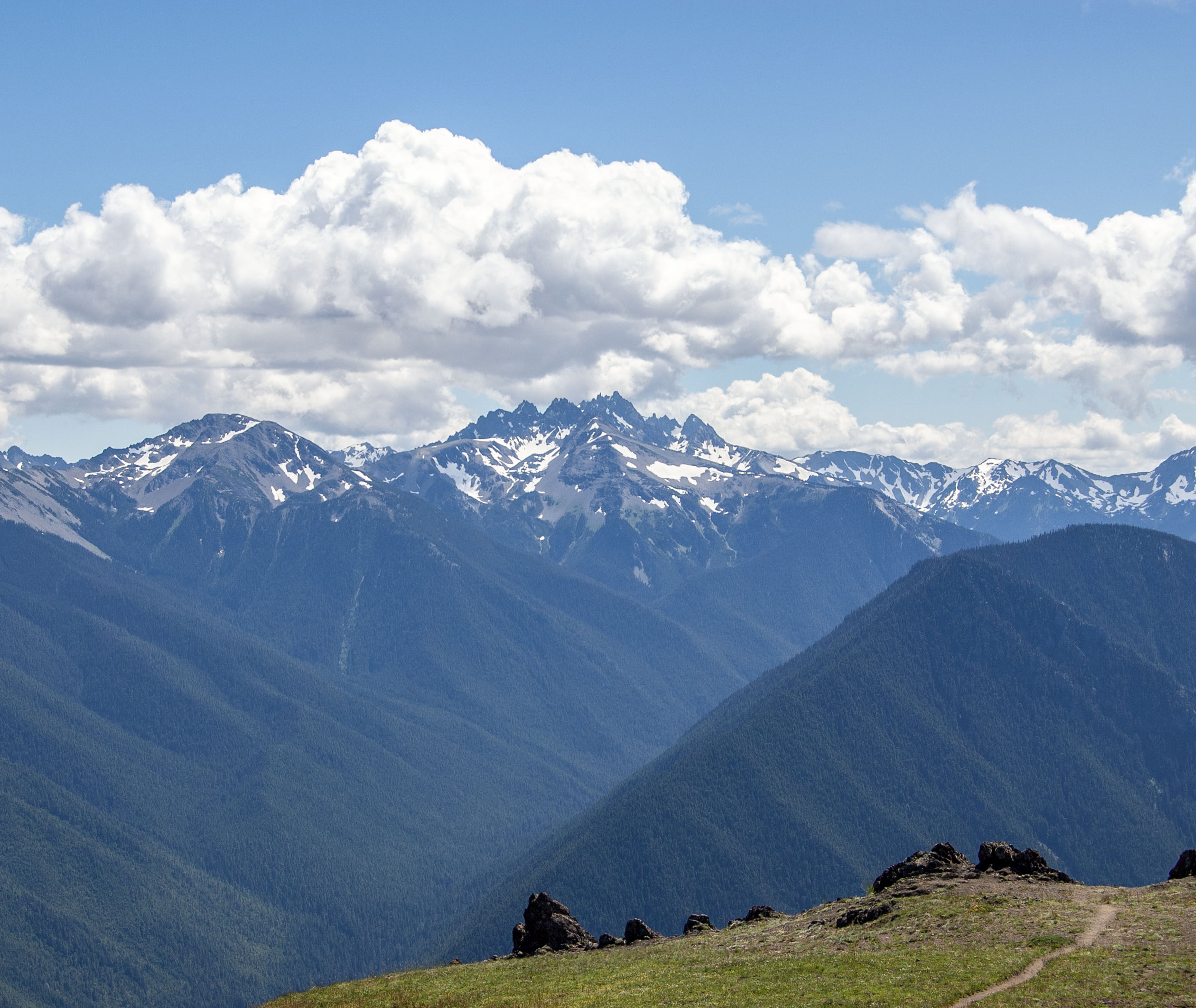
- View of Mount Walkinshaw from Blue Mountain, Olympic National Forest, Washington

Highest point
- Elevation: 7,378 ft (2,249 m)
- Prominence: 378 ft (115 m)
- Parent peak: Mount Clark
- Coordinates: 47°50′55″N 123°14′14″W

Geography
- Location within Washington (state) Location within the United States
- Country: United States
- State: Washington
- County: Jefferson
- Protected area: Olympic National Park
- Parent range: Olympic Mountains
- Topo map: USGS Mount Deception

Geology
- Rock age: Eocene
- Rock type(s): shale, pillow basalt

Climbing
- First ascent: 1961 by Joe Munson, Jim Parolini
- Easiest route: Scramble class 3 via West Side or Gray Wolf Ridge

Mount Walkinshaw is a 7,378-foot (2,249 m) mountain summit located in the Olympic Mountains, in Jefferson County of Washington state. It is situated within Olympic National Park, and is the northernmost peak in The Needles range, which is a subset of the Olympic range. Its nearest higher peak is Mount Clark, 0.9 mi (1.4 km) to the south, and Gray Wolf Ridge arcs to the northeast. Mount Walkinshaw is set in the eastern portion of the Olympic Mountains within the drainage basin of the Dungeness River. This position puts it in the rain shadow of the Olympic Range, resulting in less precipitation than Mount Olympus and the western Olympics receive.

== History ==
Originally known as The Citadel, the Mount Walkinshaw toponym was officially adopted in 1965 to commemorate Robert B. Walkinshaw (1884-1963), author and lawyer whose conservation efforts contributed to the establishment of Olympic National Park. The mountain's name was submitted for consideration by Walter Walkinshaw, the son of Robert, with the location chosen to be next to Mount Clark, named for Irving M. Clark who was also a Seattle conservationist, and an old acquaintance of Robert Walkinshaw.

The first ascent of the peak was made in 1961 by Joe Munson and Jim Parolini.

== Climate ==
Mount Walkinshaw is located in the marine west coast climate zone of western North America. Weather fronts originating in the Pacific Ocean travel northeast toward the Olympic Mountains. As fronts approach, they are forced upward by the peaks (orographic lift), causing them to drop their moisture in the form of rain or snow. As a result, the Olympics experience high precipitation, especially during the winter months in the form of snowfall. Because of maritime influence, snow tends to be wet and heavy, resulting in avalanche danger. During winter months weather is usually cloudy, but due to high pressure systems over the Pacific Ocean that intensify during summer months, there is often little or no cloud cover during the summer. The months July through September offer the most favorable weather for climbing Mount Walkinshaw.

== Geology ==
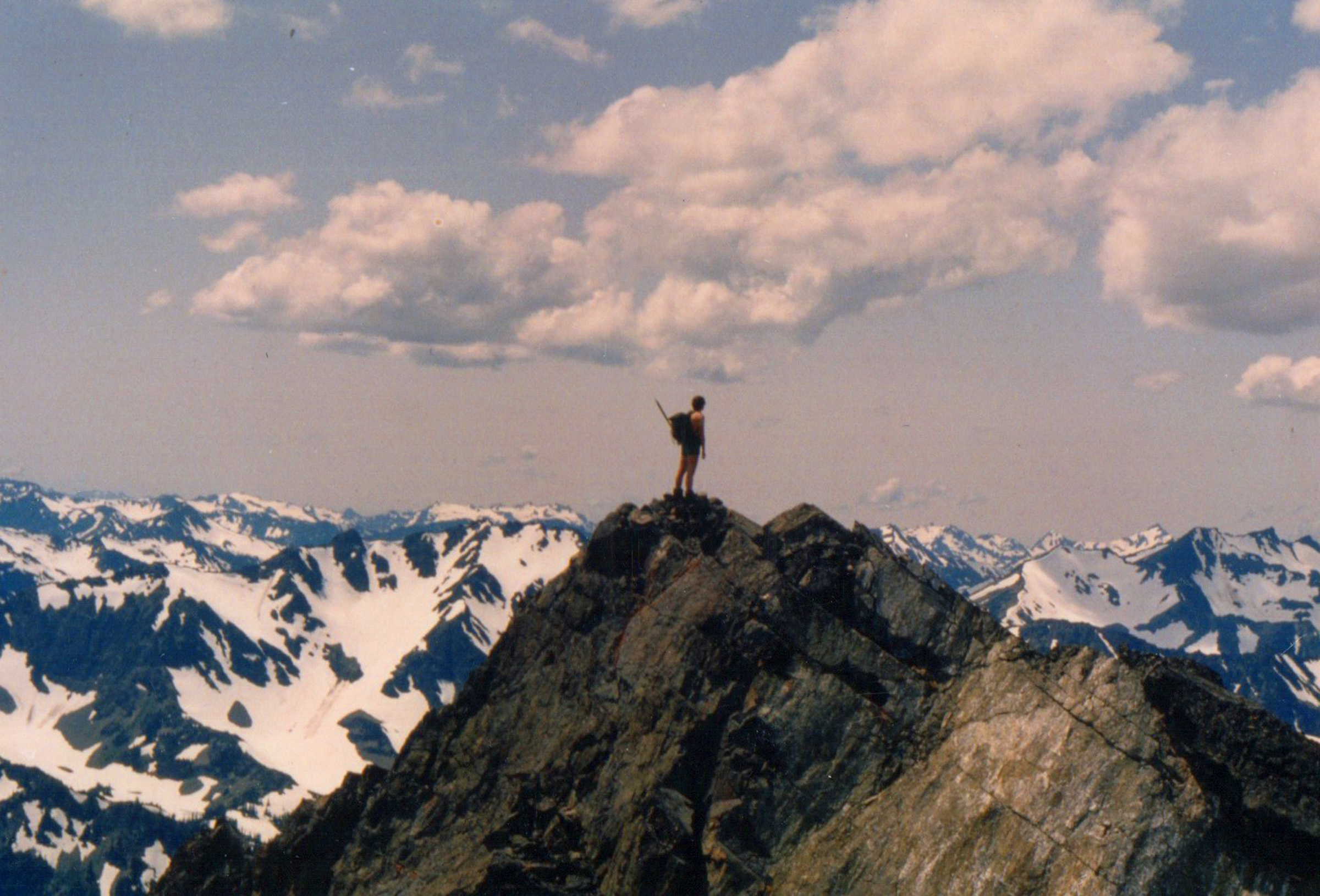
Walter Walkinshaw on the summit of Mount Walkinshaw

The Olympic Mountains are composed of obducted clastic wedge material and oceanic crust, primarily Eocene sandstone, turbidite, and basaltic oceanic crust. The mountains were sculpted during the Pleistocene era by erosion and glaciers advancing and retreating multiple times. Mt. Walkinshaw has a small rocky summit about 10 feet in diameter.

== See also ==
- Olympic Mountains
- Geology of the Pacific Northwest
- Geography of Washington (state)
