= Hal Foss Peak =

Mountain in Washington (state), United States

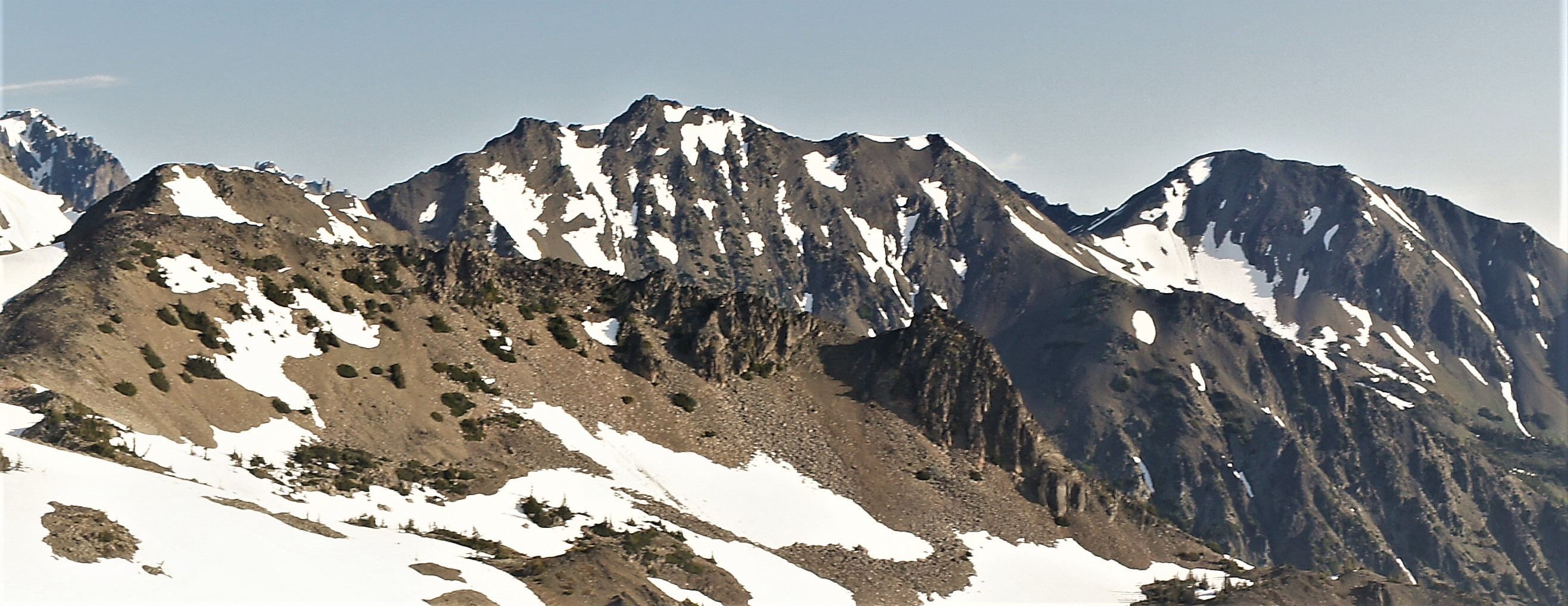
- South aspect

Highest point
- Elevation: 7,179 ft (2,188 m)
- Prominence: 419 ft (128 m)
- Parent peak: Mount Mystery (7,639 ft)
- Isolation: 0.60 mi (0.97 km)
- Coordinates: 47°47′58″N 123°12′34″W

Naming
- Etymology: Harold Alfred "Hal" Foss

Geography
- Location within Washington (state) Location within the United States
- Country: United States
- State: Washington
- County: Jefferson
- Protected area: Olympic National Park
- Parent range: Olympic Mountains
- Topo map: USGS Mount Deception

Climbing
- Easiest route: class 2 scrambling via Mt. Fricaba

Hal Foss Peak is a 7,179-foot-elevation (2,188 m) mountain summit located in the Olympic Mountains, in Jefferson County of Washington state. It is situated within Olympic National Park, and the Daniel J. Evans Wilderness. The nearest higher neighbor is Mount Mystery, 0.6 miles (0.97 km) to the southwest, and Mount Fricaba is 0.74 miles (1.19 km) to the northeast. Precipitation runoff from the peak drains east to the Dungeness River via Heather Creek, and west into Deception Creek which is a tributary of the Dosewallips River. Topographic relief is significant as the summit rises 2,800 feet (853 m) above Heather Creek in approximately one mile.

== Etymology ==
The mountain's name was officially adopted in 1977 by the United States Board on Geographic Names to honor Harold Alfred "Hal" Foss (1922–1974), the first Search and Rescue coordinator for the Washington State Department of Emergency Services. He was instrumental in forming the National Search and Rescue Coordinators Association, of which he was president. He was also president of the Mountain Rescue Association, chairman of the Washington Mountain Rescue Council, and member of the American Alpine Club. Foss died of a heart attack while climbing Mount St. Helens with his 18-year-old son Lynn on July 14, 1974.

== Climate ==
Hal Foss Peak is located in the marine west coast climate zone of western North America. Weather fronts originating in the Pacific Ocean travel northeast toward the Olympic Mountains. As fronts approach, they are forced upward by the peaks (orographic lift), causing them to drop their moisture in the form of rain or snow. As a result, the Olympics experience high precipitation, especially during the winter months in the form of snowfall. Because of maritime influence, snow tends to be wet and heavy, resulting in avalanche danger. During winter months weather is usually cloudy, but due to high pressure systems over the Pacific Ocean that intensify during summer months, there is often little or no cloud cover during the summer. The months July through September offer the most favorable weather for climbing Hal Foss Peak.

== Gallery ==
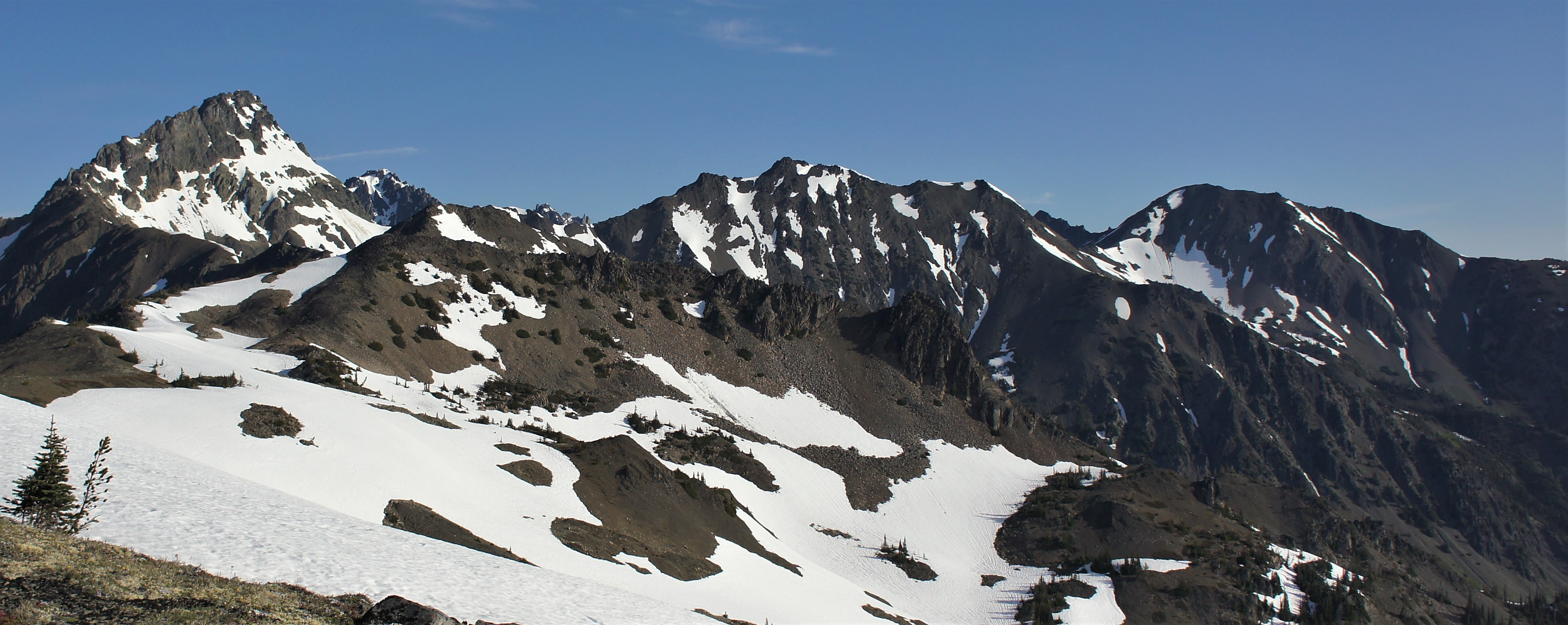
Mount Mystery (left), Hal Foss Peak (center), and Mount Fricaba (right).

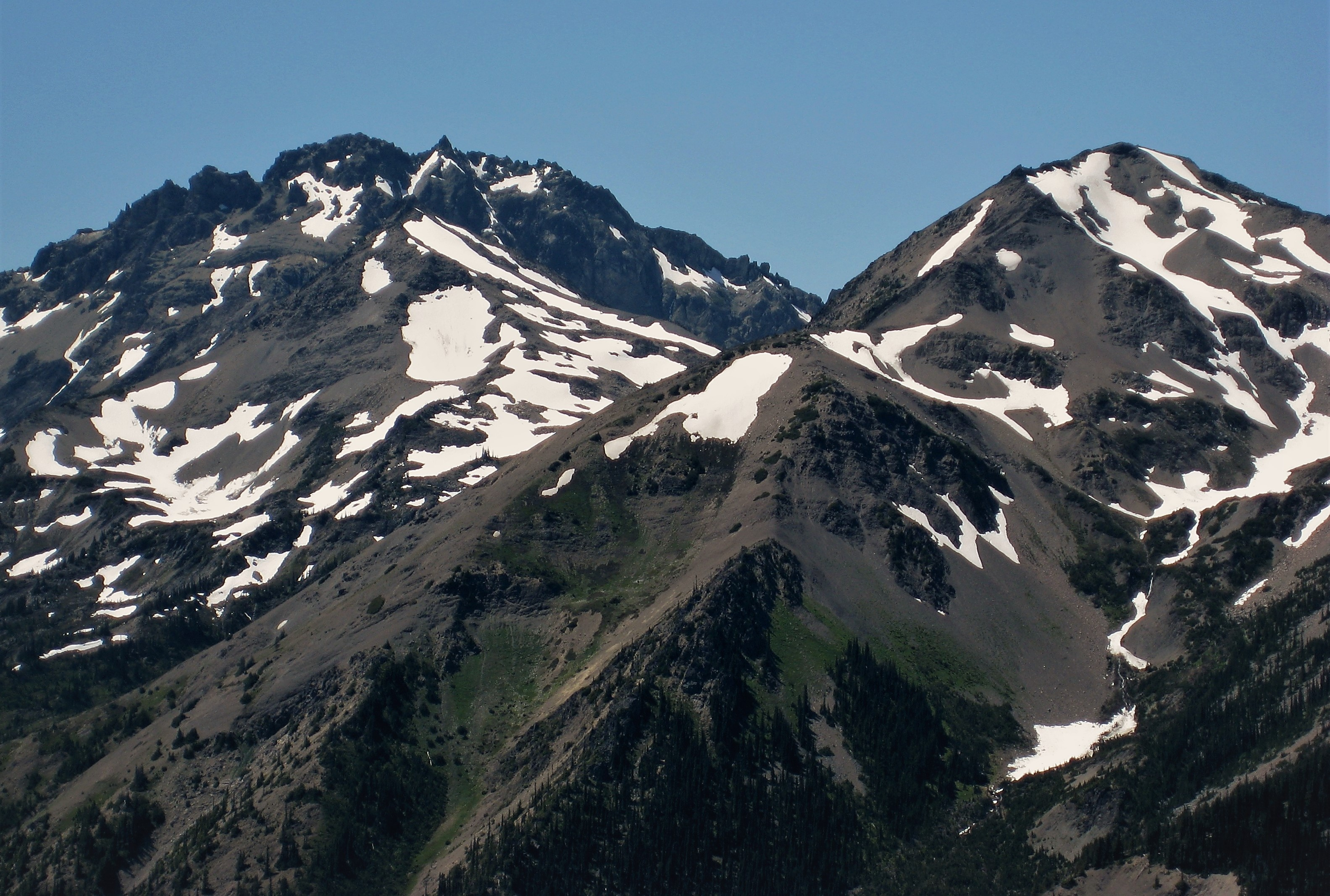
Hal Foss Peak to left with Mount Mystery looming directly behind it.
Mount Fricaba to right. View from Marmot Pass.

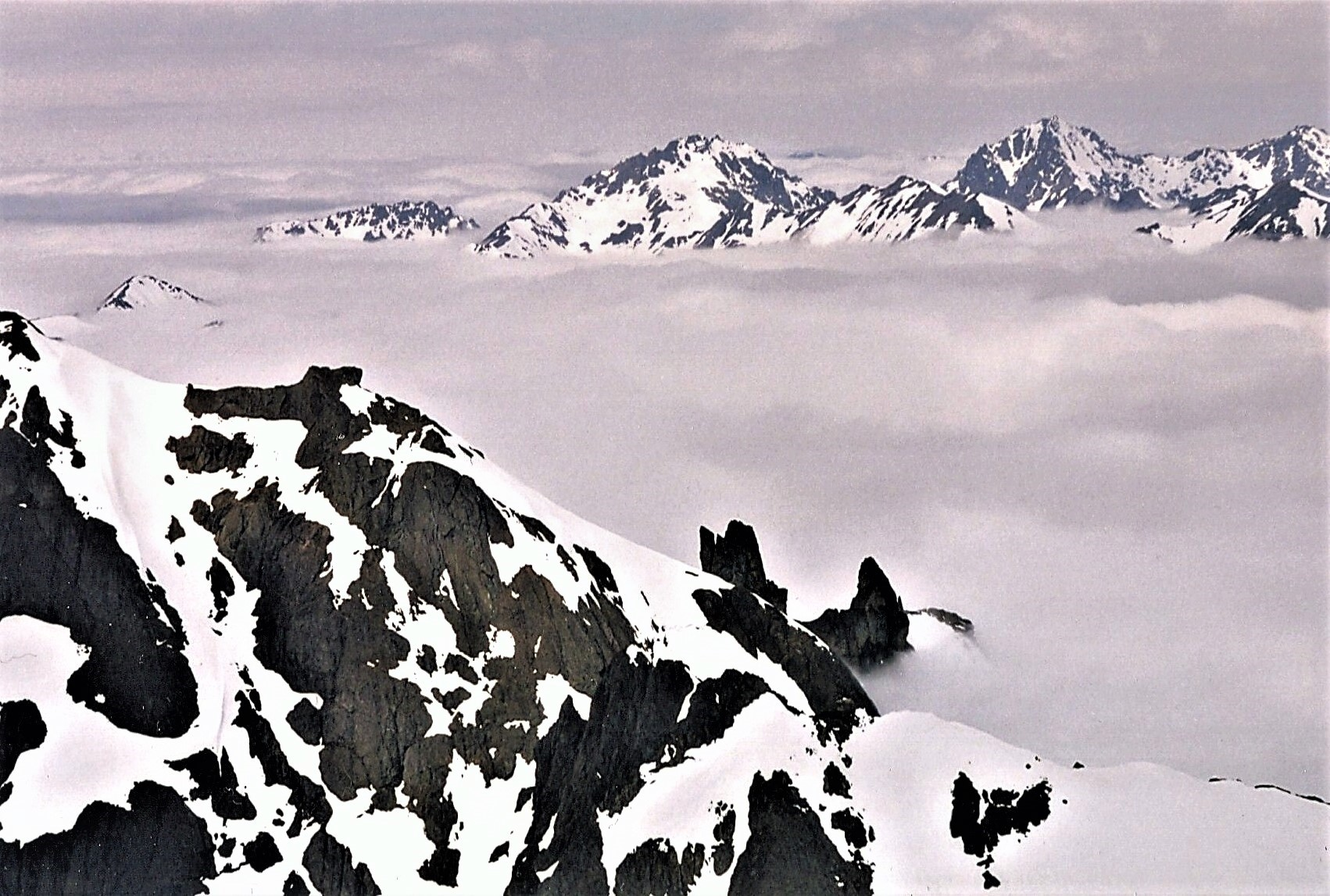
The two prominent peaks in the distance are Mts. Mystery and Deception.
Hal Foss Peak can be seen between them. View is from Mt. Constance.

== See also ==
- Olympic Mountains
- Geology of the Pacific Northwest
