= Nebria danmanni =

Scientific classification
- Kingdom: Animalia
- Phylum: Arthropoda
- Clade: Pancrustacea
- Class: Insecta
- Order: Coleoptera
- Suborder: Adephaga
- Family: Carabidae
- Genus: Nebria
- Species: N. danmanni

Binomial name
- Nebria danmanni Kavanaugh, 1981

Synonyms
- Nebria (Eunebria) danmanni Kavanaugh, 1981; Nebria (Reductonebria) danmanni Ledoux & Roux, 2005

Species of beetle

Nebria (Erwinebria) danmanni, Dan Mann's gazelle beetle, is a species of ground beetle from the subgenus Erwinebria of the genus Nebria in the subfamily Nebriinae that is endemic to high altitudes in the Olympic Mountains of Washington. It was described by David H. Kavanaugh in 1981 and named after Daniel H. Mann, who collected the first specimens and holotype of the species. It is currently recognized as a sister group to the rest of its subgenus, although it was previously placed in the more distantly related subgenus Eunebria. It was once placed in the subgenus Reductonebria in the Catonebria series, which has been elevated to a complex including three subgenera: Insulanebria, Reductonebria proper, and Erwinebria.

== Description ==
Its back is very shiny. On the pronotum, the angle of the apex is strongly projected frontward, the angle of the base is rectangular, toothed, and somewhat projected backwards, the curve at the base of the sides is long and shallow, and there are no setae in the middle. The elytra have a microstructure composed of a very regular grid, a roughly rectangular, heavily elongated silhouette slightly narrowed towards the base, and a distinctively angled humerus that has a ridge facing prominently forwards. They are brachypterous, with very short and narrow hindwings. The middle tibia is relatively curved inwards and lined with grooves towards the top in the middle, with the setae on the back being relatively dense near the apex. The legs have 2 or more hairs at the base. The undersides of the 3rd to 5th noticeable sterna each have a minimum of 2 pairs of setae at the back near the middle.

== Habitat & ecology ==
It is known only from elevations of 1770-1980 meters in Olympic National Park, having originally been found at the type locality of Deception Basin at 1830 meters and on the east slope of Mount Mystery at 1800-1860 meters. There it inhabits the edges of cold rills on wet ground near glaciers. Adults are found from July to September. They are nocturnal, predatory, and flightless, being active at night when they hunt half-frozen insects on glaciers and hiding under rubble and the glaciers during the day.
