= Mount Fricaba =

Mountain in Washington (state), United States

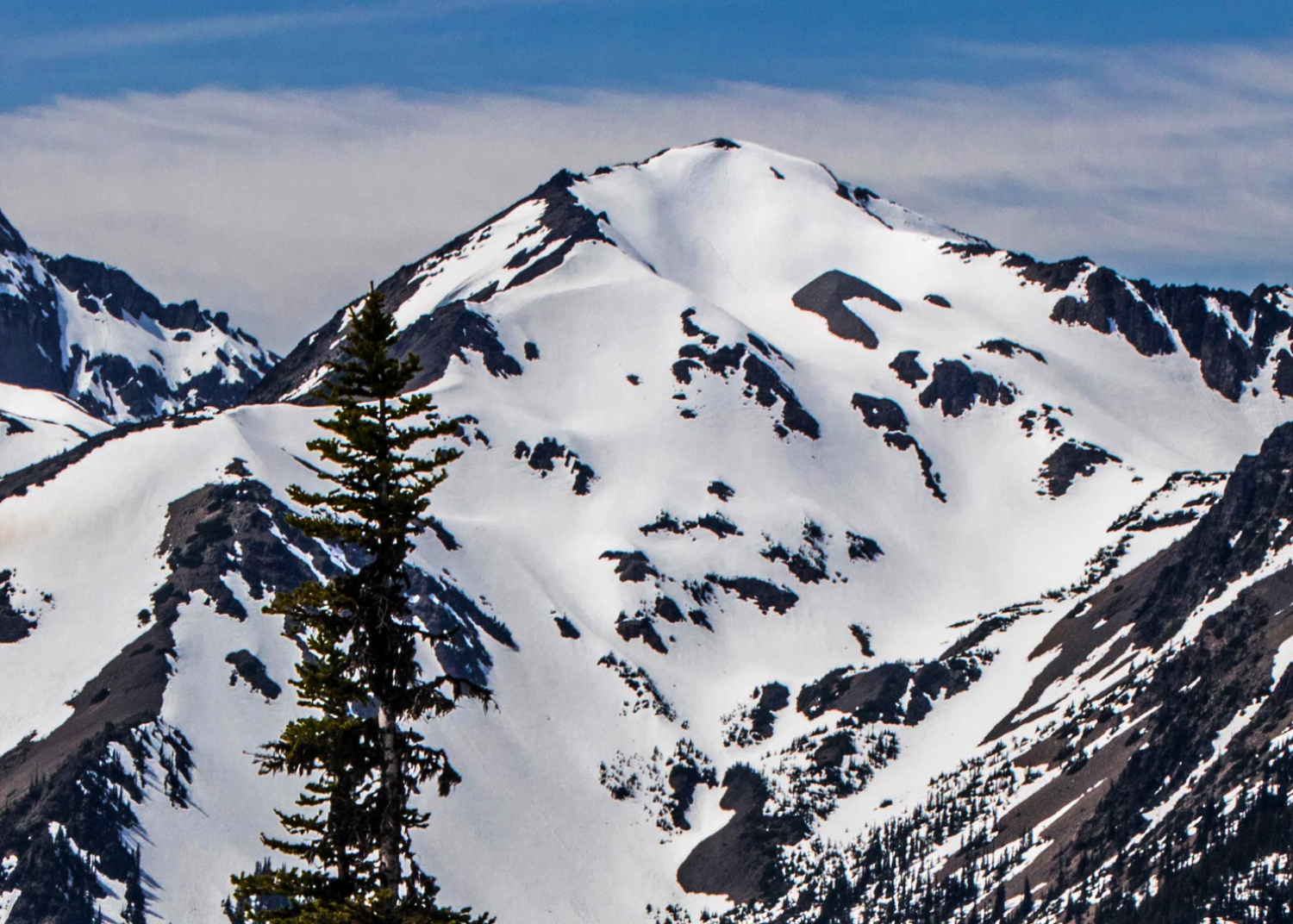
- Mount Fricaba, east aspect

Highest point
- Elevation: 7,139 ft (2,176 m)
- Prominence: 539 ft (164 m)
- Coordinates: 47°48′29″N 123°11′59″W

Geography
- Location within Washington (state) Location within the United States
- Country: United States
- State: Washington
- County: Jefferson
- Protected area: Olympic National Park
- Parent range: Olympic Mountains
- Topo map: USGS Mount Deception

Climbing
- First ascent: 1957 by Don Bechlem, Jack Newman
- Easiest route: Scrambling class 2 via Deception Basin

Mount Fricaba is a 7,139-foot-elevation (2,176 m) double summit mountain located in the Olympic Mountains, in Jefferson County of Washington state. It is situated on the shared border of Olympic National Park with Buckhorn Wilderness, and is the highest point in that wilderness, as well as the Olympic National Forest. Its nearest higher peak is Hal Foss Peak, 0.74 miles (1.19 km) to the southwest. Precipitation runoff from the peak drains east into headwaters of the Dungeness River, or west into Deception Creek which is a tributary of the Dosewallips River. The mountain's name was officially adopted in 1961 by the United States Board on Geographic Names based on usage by The Mountaineers since 1907, and inclusion in Fred Beckey's "Climber's Guide to the Cascade and Olympic Mountains of Washington" published in 1949. The first ascent of the mountain was made in 1957 by Don Bechlem and Jack Newman.

== Climate ==
Mount Fricaba is located in the marine west coast climate zone of western North America. Weather fronts originating in the Pacific Ocean travel northeast toward the Olympic Mountains. As fronts approach, they are forced upward by the peaks (orographic lift), causing them to drop their moisture in the form of rain or snow. As a result, the Olympics experience high precipitation, especially during the winter months in the form of snowfall. Because of maritime influence, snow tends to be wet and heavy, resulting in avalanche danger. During winter months weather is usually cloudy, but due to high pressure systems over the Pacific Ocean that intensify during summer months, there is often little or no cloud cover during the summer. The months July through September offer the most favorable weather for climbing Mount Fricaba.

== Geology ==
The Olympic Mountains are composed of obducted clastic wedge material and oceanic crust, primarily Eocene sandstone, turbidite, and basaltic oceanic crust. The mountains were sculpted during the Pleistocene era by erosion and glaciers advancing and retreating multiple times.

== Gallery ==
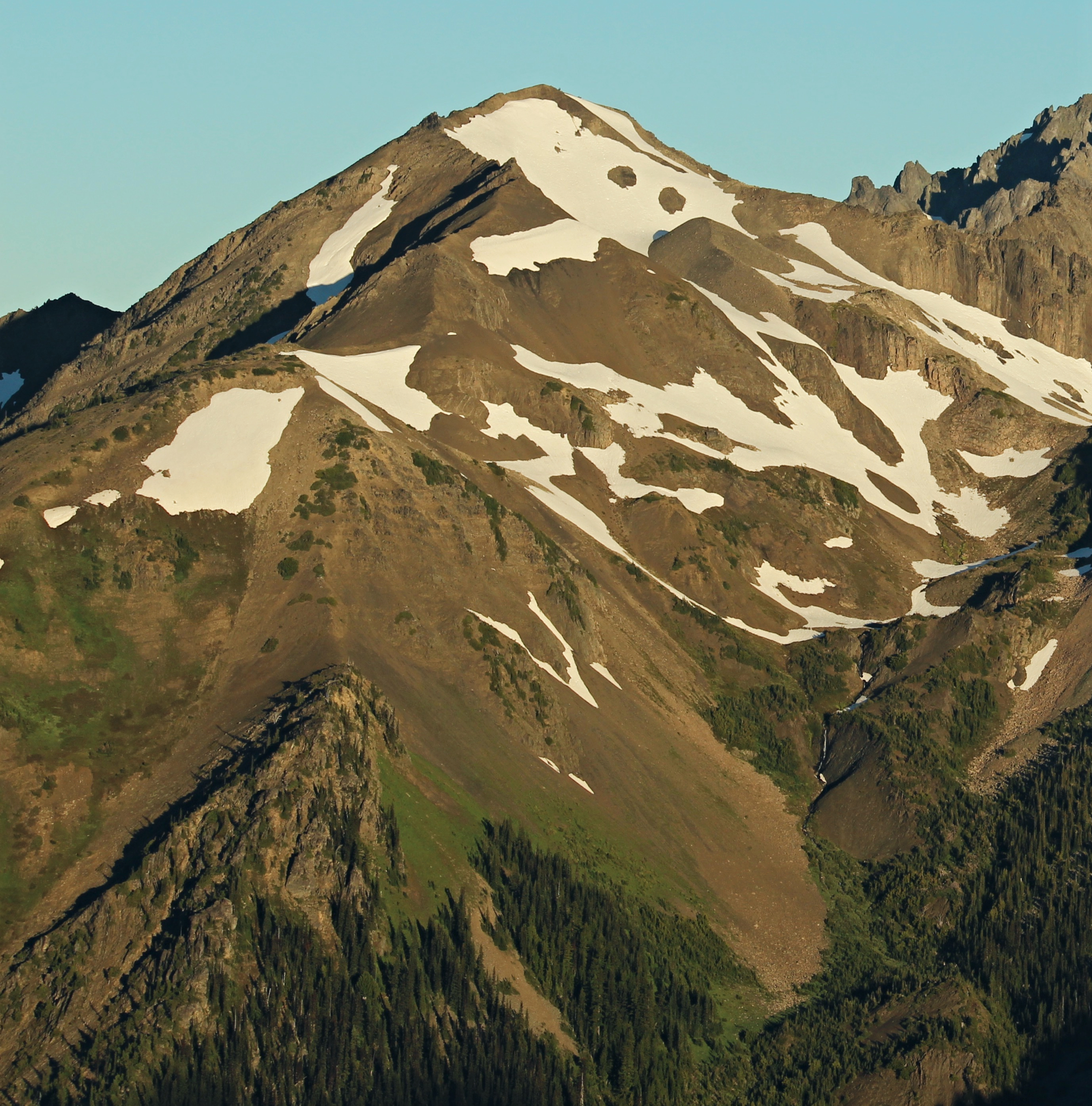
Mount Fricaba

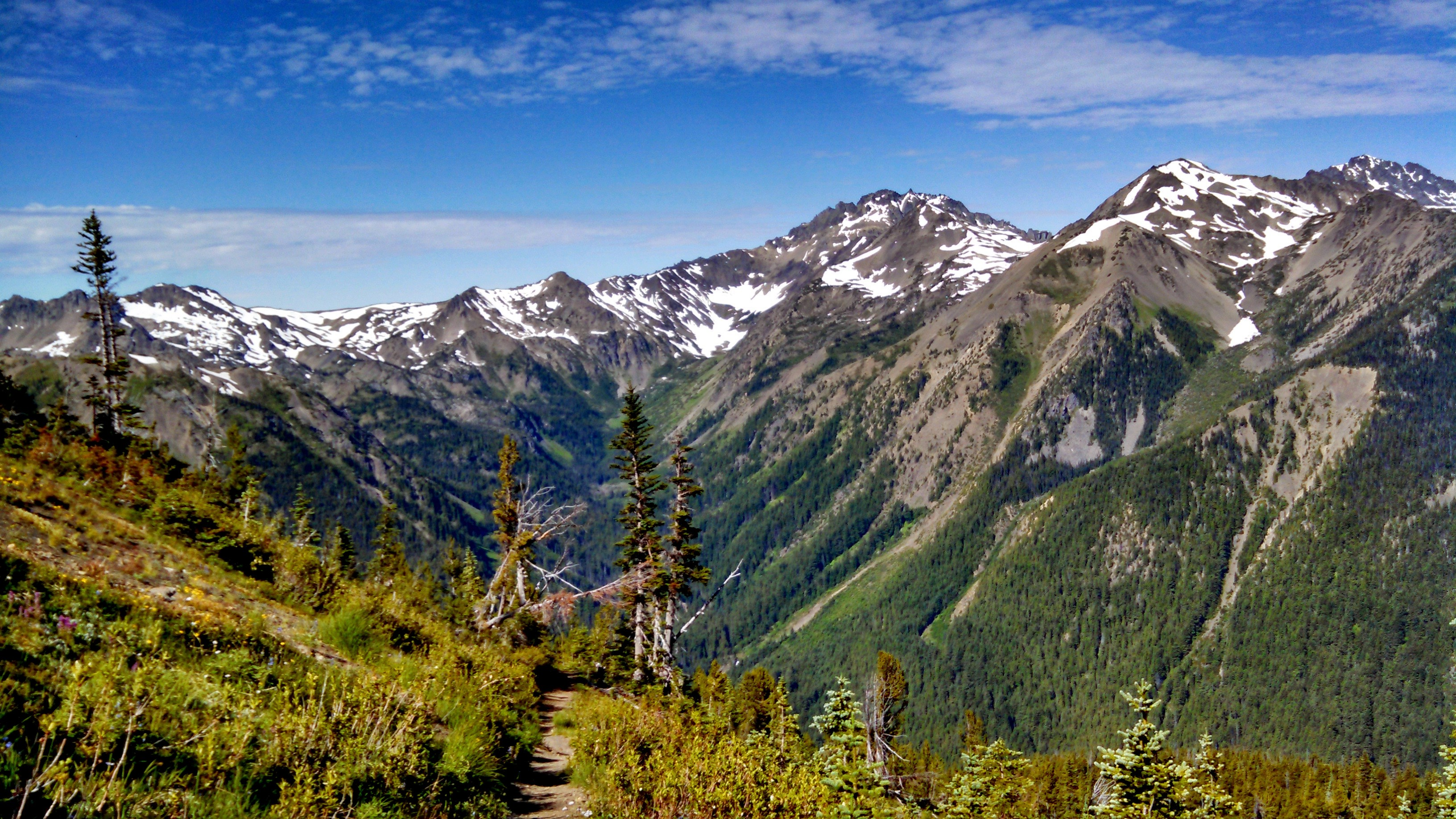
Mount Mystery and Fricaba (right) seen from Pacific Northwest National Scenic Trail

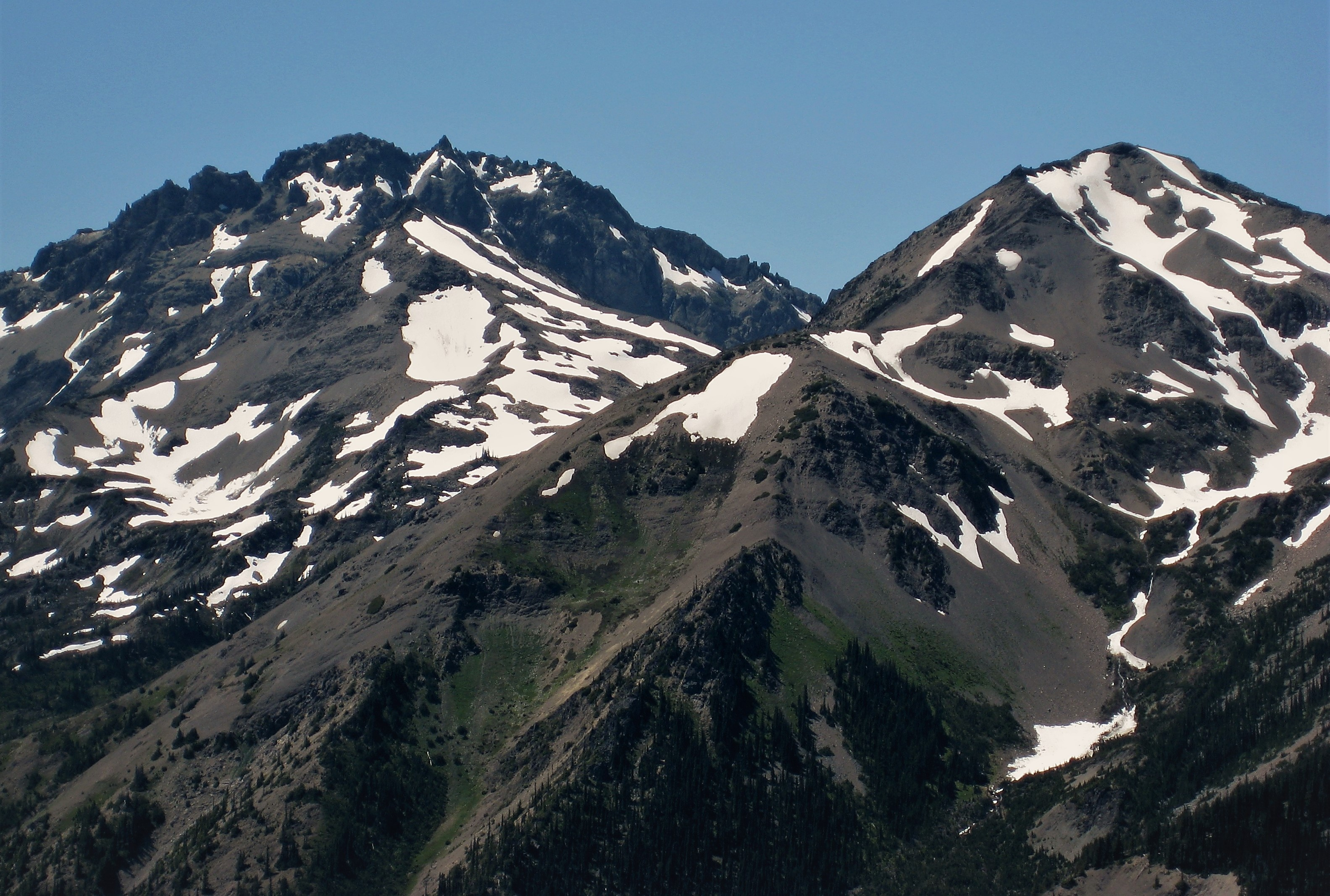
Hal Foss Peak to left with Mount Mystery directly behind. Mount Fricaba to right. Viewed from Marmot Pass.

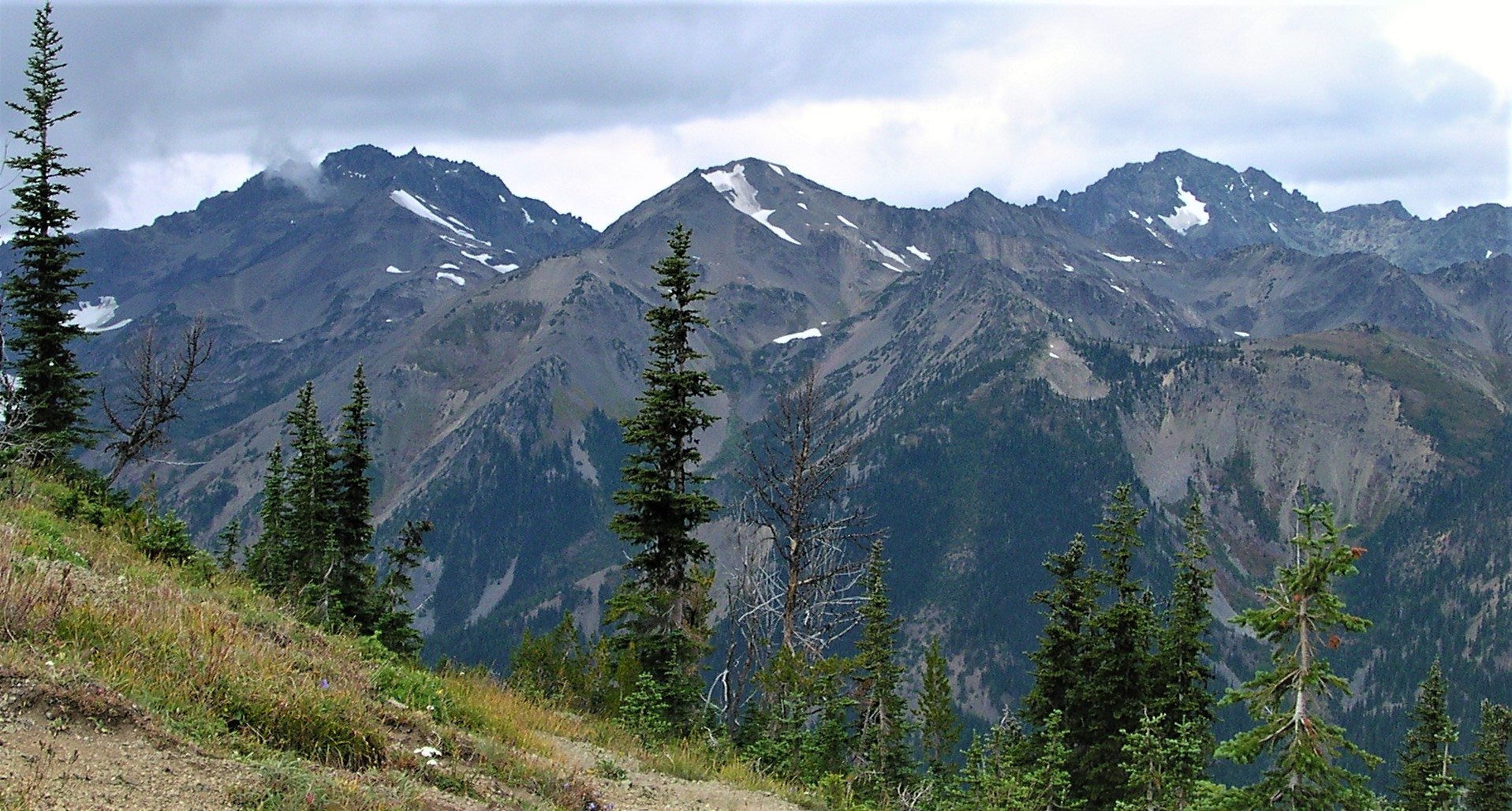
Mt. Mystery (left), Mt. Fricaba (center), Mt. Deception (right) seen from Marmot Pass

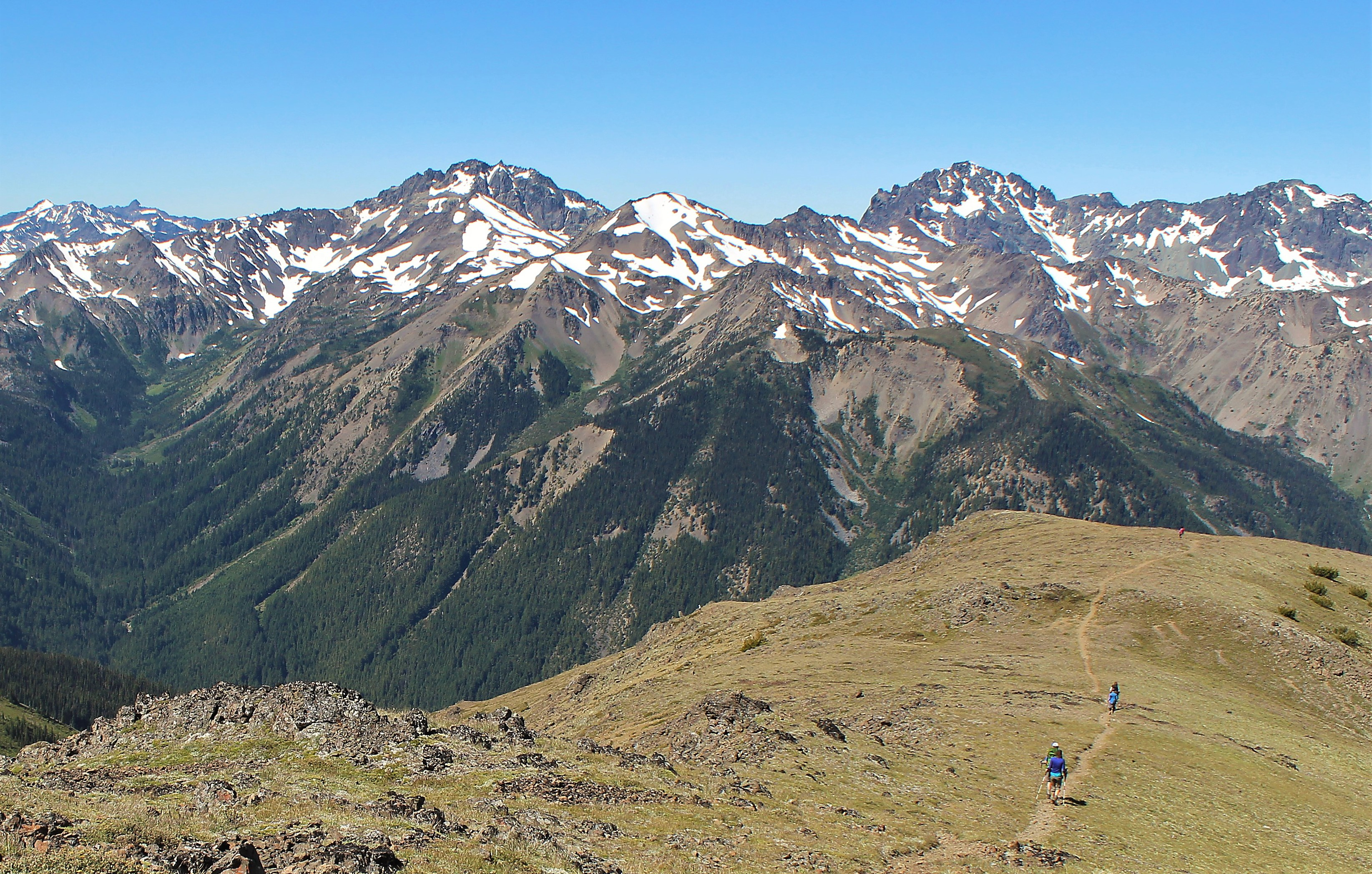
Mt. Fricaba centered, seen from Buckhorn Mountain

== See also ==
- Olympic Mountains
- Geology of the Pacific Northwest
- Geography of Washington (state)
