= Mount Mystery =

Mountain in Washington (state), United States

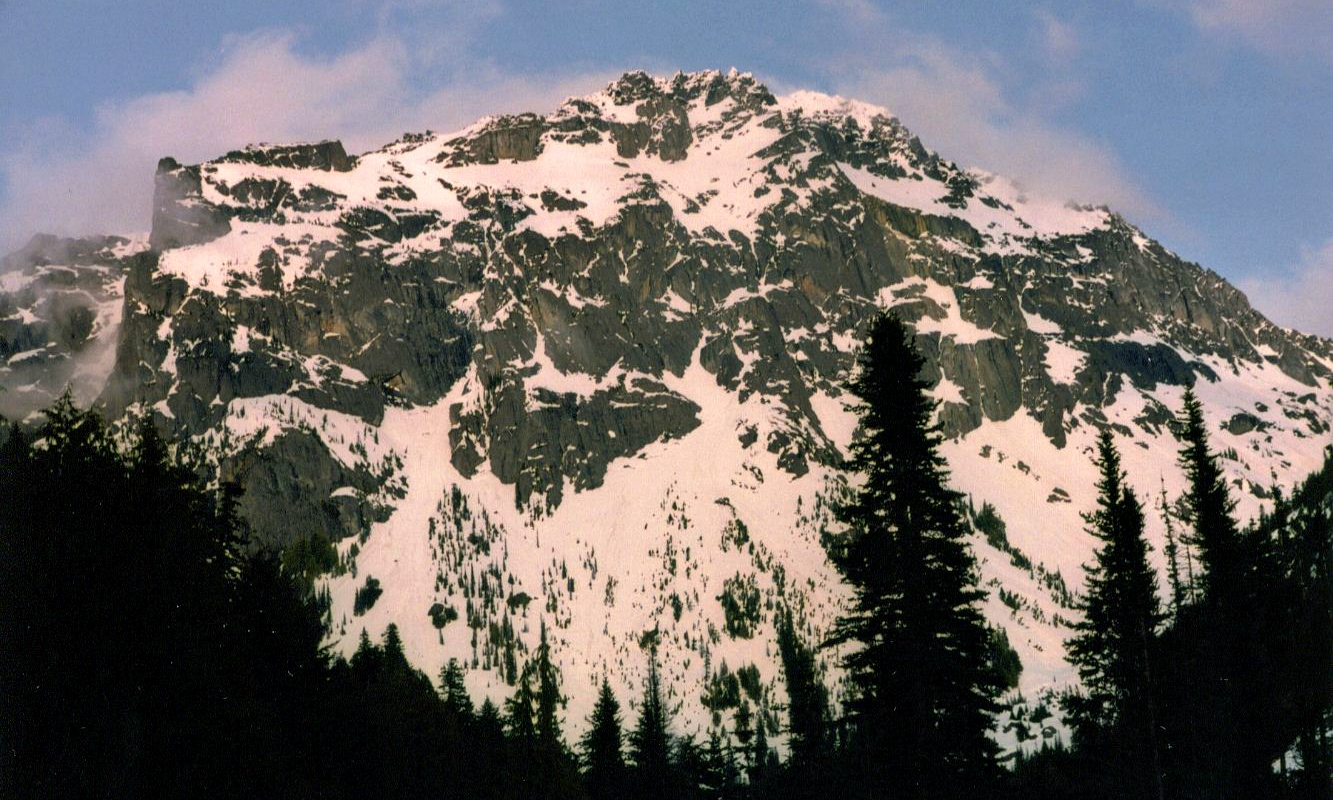
- Mount Mystery's west face

Highest point
- Elevation: 7,639 ft (2,328 m)
- Prominence: 1,119 ft (341 m)
- Parent peak: Mount Deception
- Isolation: 1.32 mi (2.12 km)
- Coordinates: 47°47′45″N 123°13′17″W

Geography
- Location within Washington (state) Location within the United States
- Country: United States
- State: Washington
- County: Jefferson
- Protected area: Olympic National Park
- Parent range: Olympic Mountains
- Topo map: USGS Mount Deception

Geology
- Rock age: Eocene
- Rock type: Tilted pillow Basalt

Climbing
- Easiest route: class 3 scrambling

Mount Mystery is a prominent 7,639-foot (2,328-metre) mountain summit located in the Olympic Mountains in Jefferson County of Washington state. It is located within Olympic National Park on the Olympic Peninsula. Mount Mystery is the sixth-highest peak of the Olympic Mountains, after Mount Olympus, Mount Deception, Mount Constance, Mount Johnson, and Inner Constance. Its nearest higher neighbor is Mount Deception, 1.32 mi (2.12 km) to the north-northwest. Little Mystery (6,941 ft) is a subsidiary summit south of Mount Mystery.

Mount Mystery is located in the eastern portion of the Olympic Mountains just south of Mount Deception at the headwaters of Deception Creek. This location puts it in the rain shadow of the Olympic Range, resulting in far less precipitation than Mount Olympus and the western Olympics receive.

Mount Mystery sits on the boundary between the drainage basins of the Dungeness River, to the north, and the Dosewallips River to the east. Deception Creek, a tributary of the Dosewallips River, drains the east and west slopes of Mount Mystery, including a small melting glacier on the east side referred to colloquially as Mystery Glacier.

Mount Mystery was given its toponym circa 1915 by G.A. Whitehead of the U.S. Forest Service because he admired its regal appearance in foggy weather.

== Climate ==
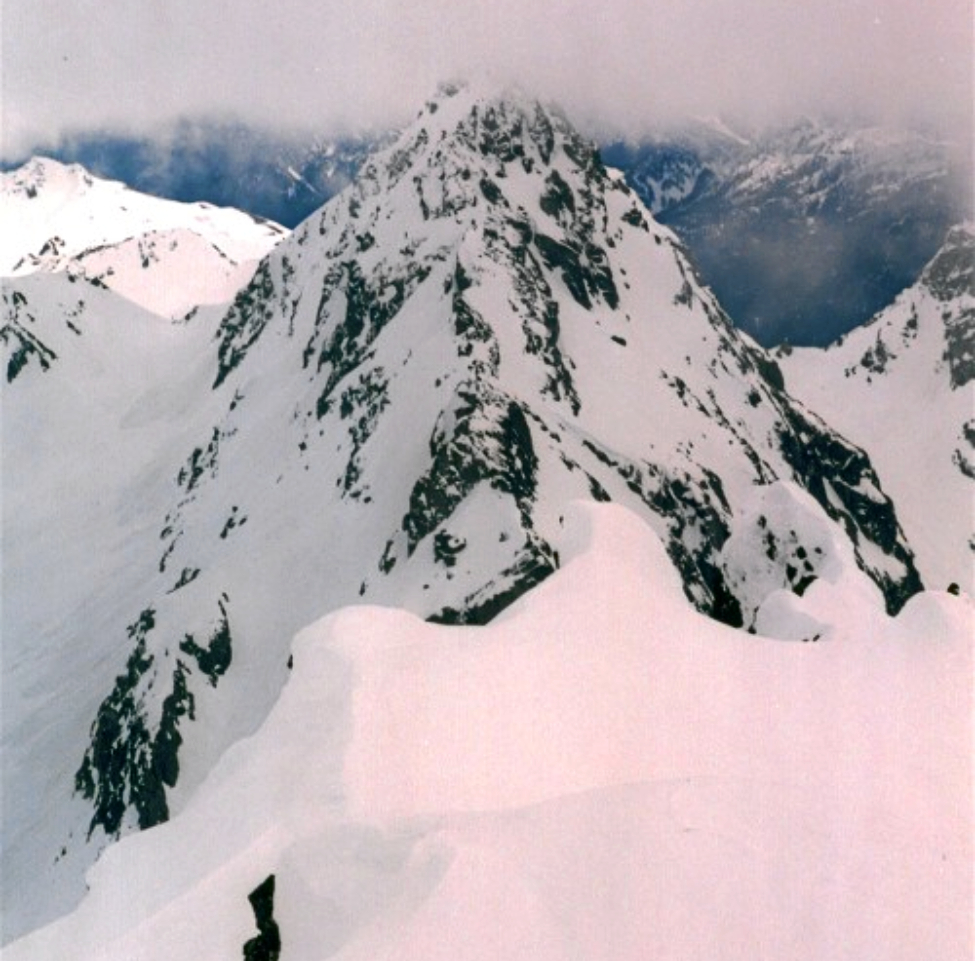
Mystery from Deception

Based on the Köppen climate classification, Mount Mystery is located in the marine west coast climate zone of western North America. Weather fronts originating in the Pacific Ocean travel northeast toward the Olympic Mountains. As fronts approach, they are forced upward by the peaks (orographic lift), causing them to drop their moisture in the form of rain or snow. As a result, the Olympics experience high precipitation, especially during the winter months in the form of snowfall. Because of maritime influence, snow tends to be wet and heavy, resulting in avalanche danger. During winter months weather is usually cloudy, but due to high pressure systems over the Pacific Ocean that intensify during summer months, there is often little or no cloud cover during the summer. The months July through September offer the most favorable weather for viewing and climbing this mountain.

== Geology ==
The Olympic Mountains are composed of obducted clastic wedge material and oceanic crust, primarily Eocene sandstone, turbidite, and basaltic oceanic crust. The mountains were sculpted during the Pleistocene era by erosion and glaciers advancing and retreating multiple times.

== Recreation ==
While not a particularly technical climb, Mount Mystery is steep and exposed. If a climber falls and does not arrest immediately, loose rock and rotten snow may make it difficult to stop falling for some distance. The nearby Needles are typically regarded as providing better, and somewhat more difficult, mountaineering objectives in the Royal Basin area.

== Gallery ==
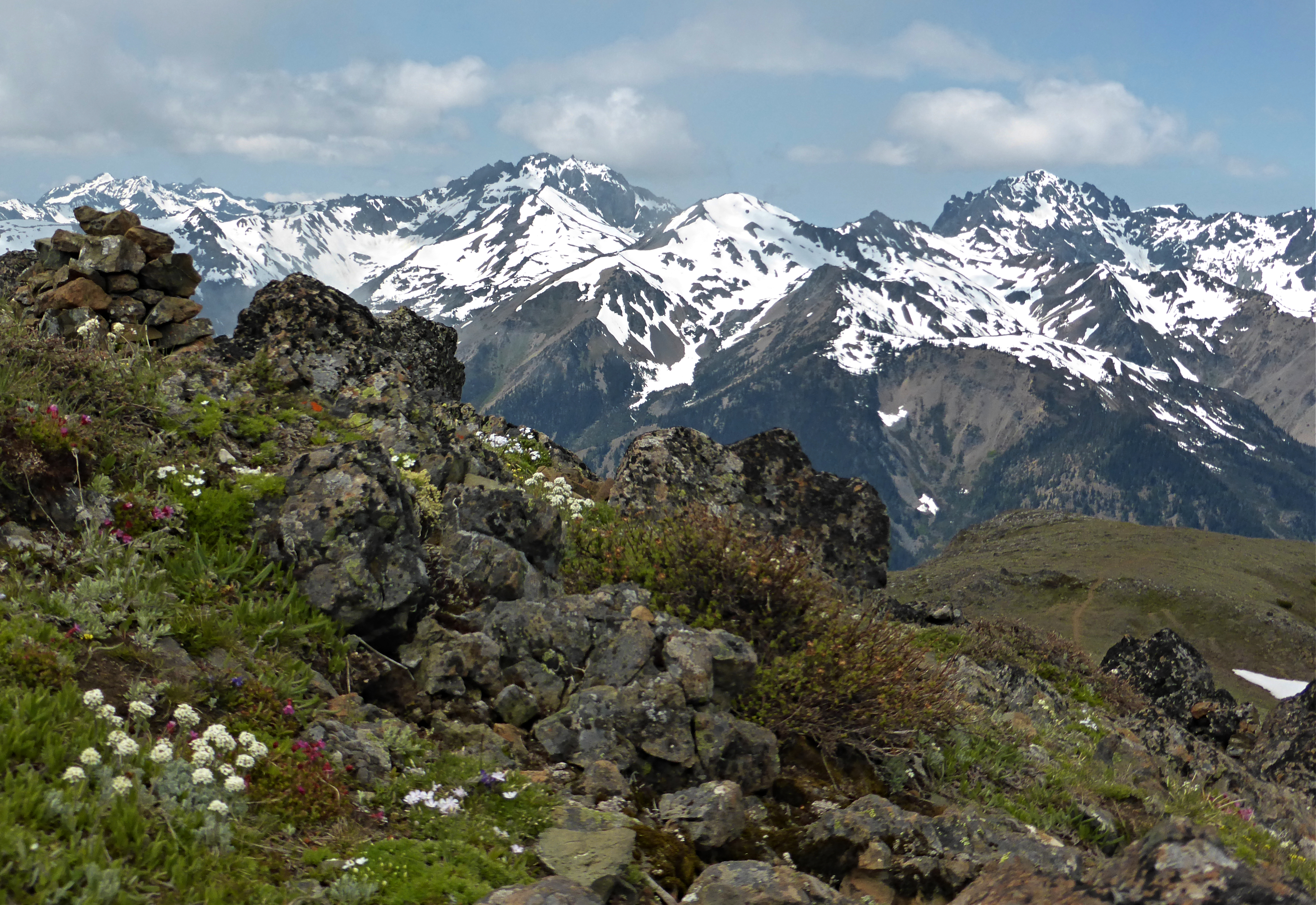
Mystery, Fricaba, and Deception from east

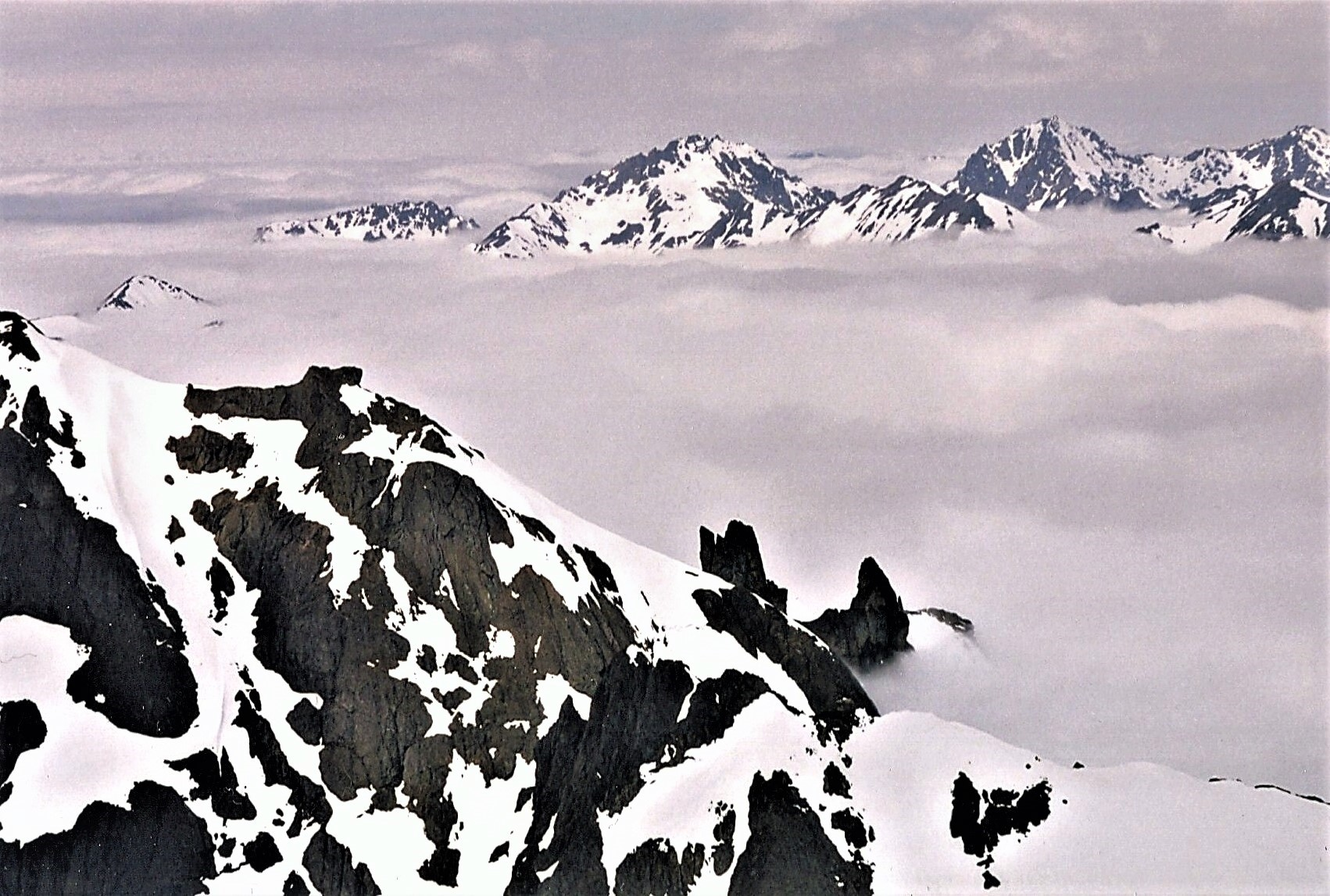
Mystery and Deception from Mt Constance

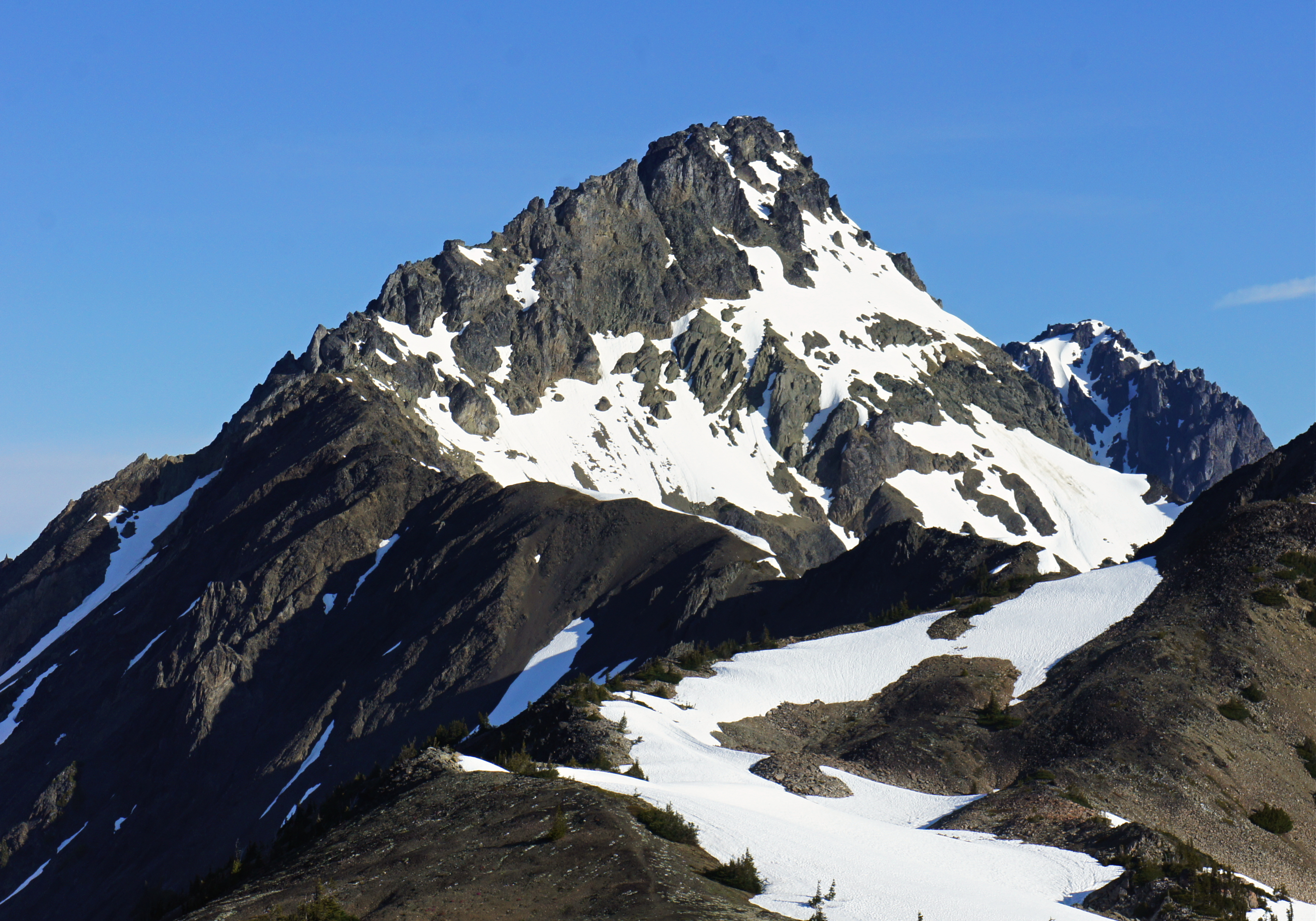
Mystery from southeast

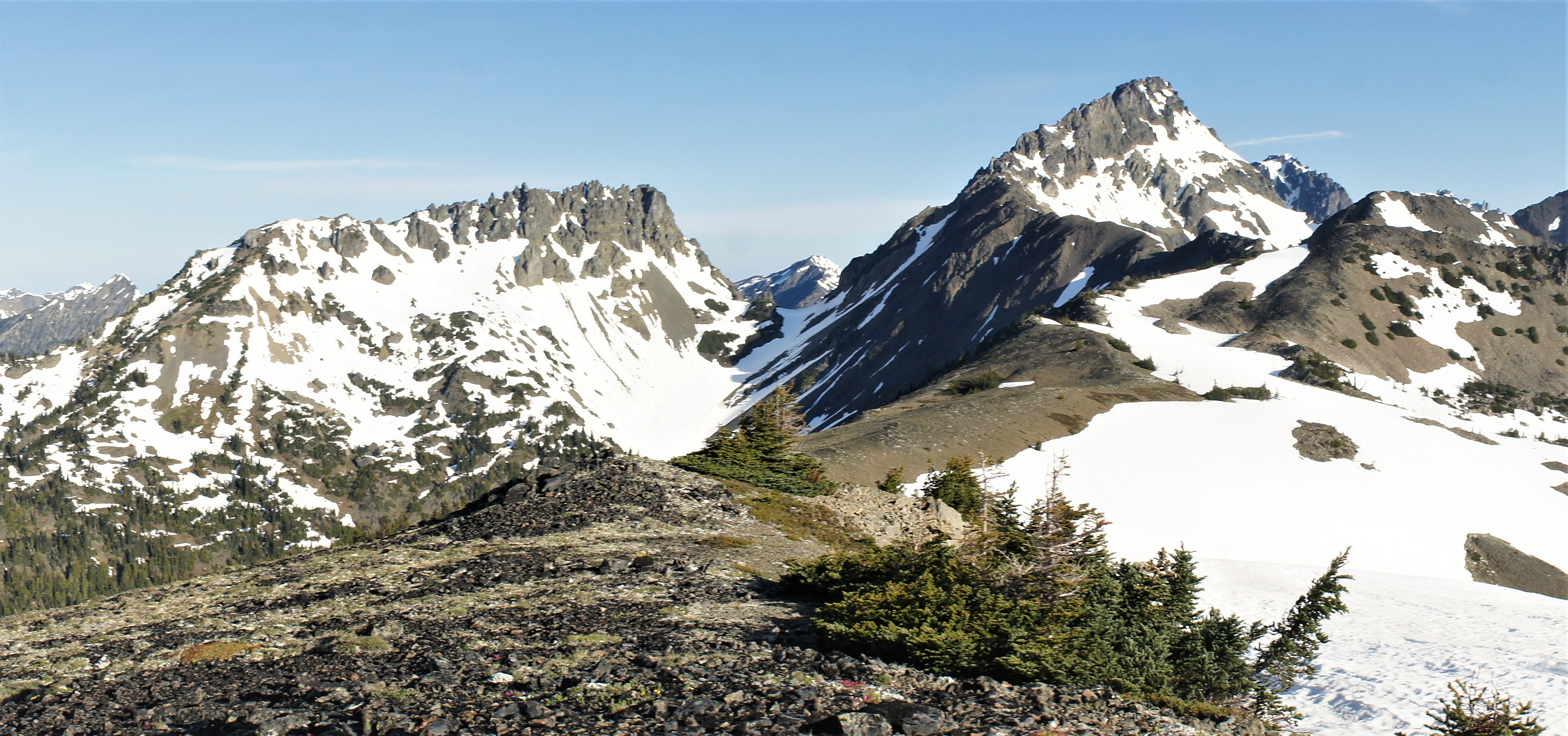
Mount Mystery (right) and Little Mystery (left) seen from the southeast

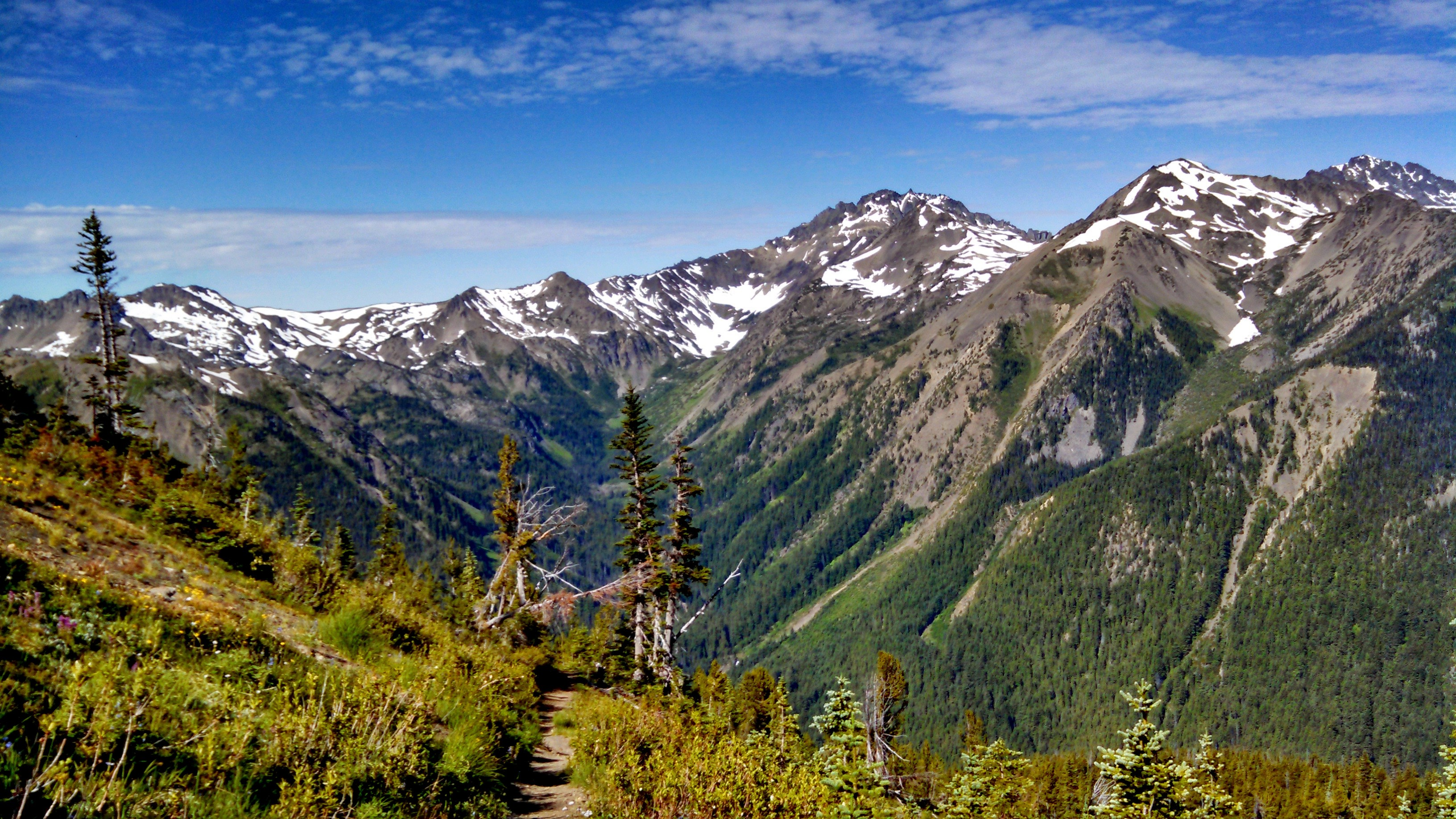
Mt. Mystery from the Pacific Northwest Trail

== See also ==
- Geology of the Pacific Northwest
