= Dale Hollow National Fish Hatchery =

Fish hatchery in Tennessee, United States

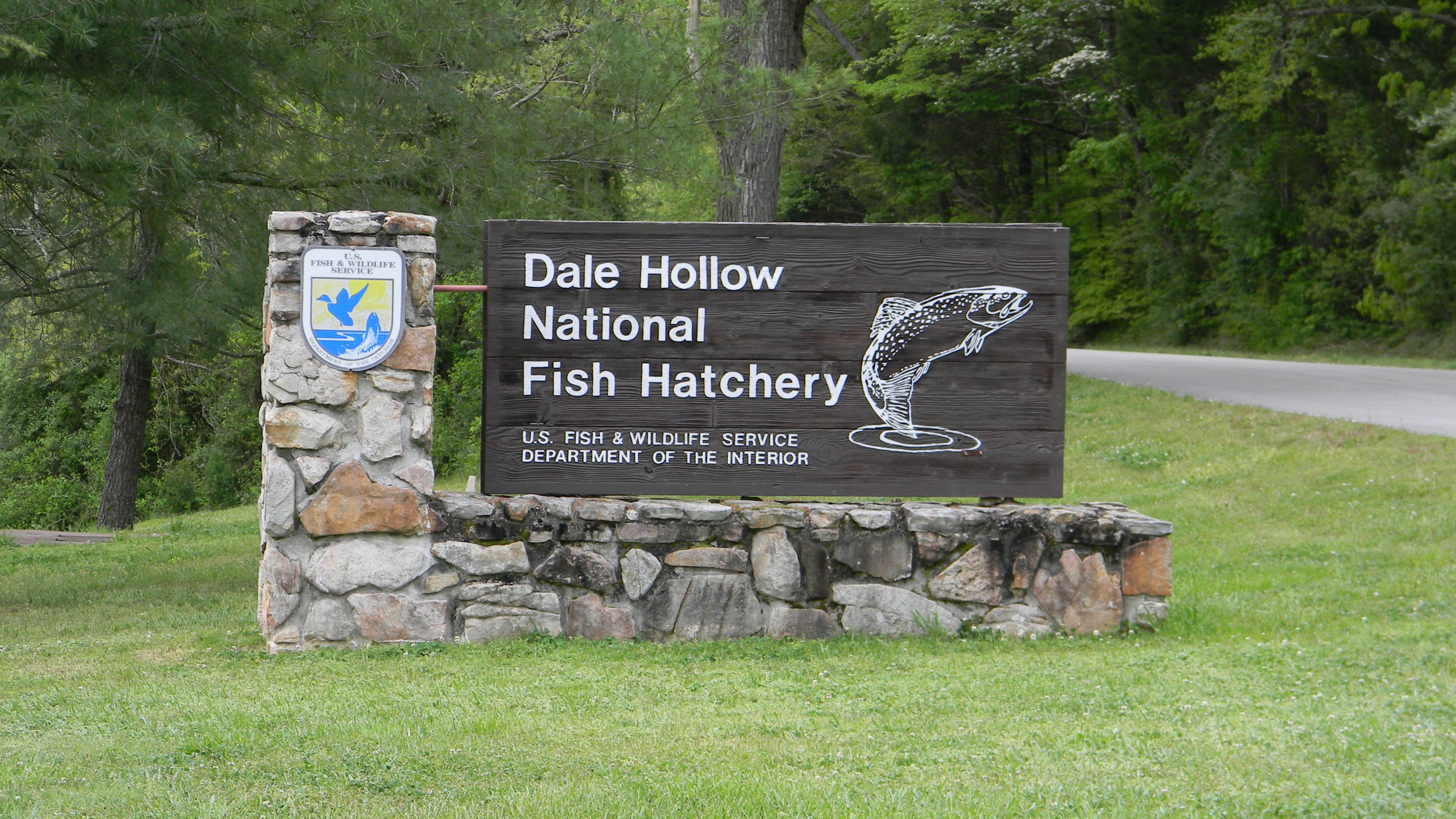

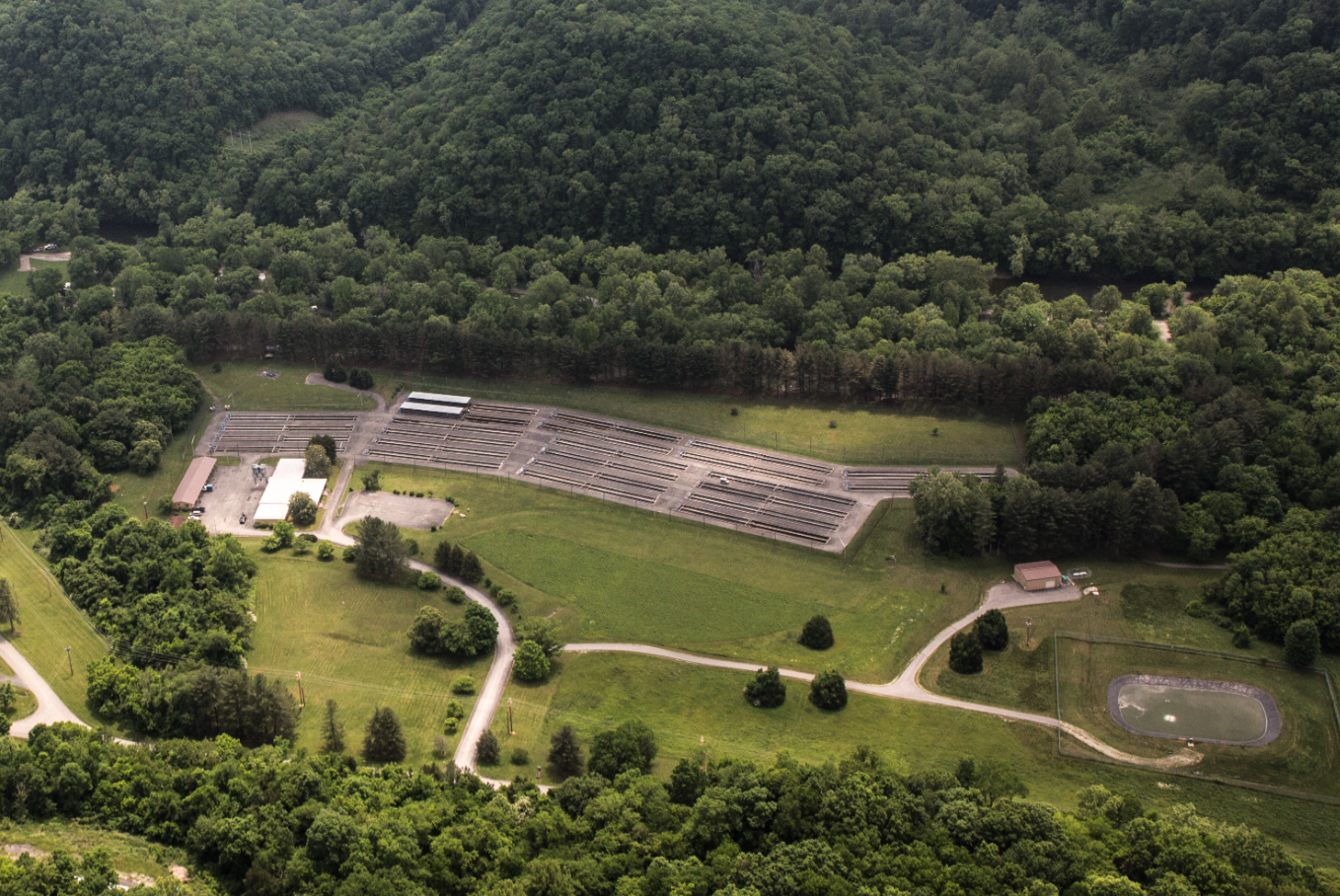
- An aerial view of the Dale Hollow National Fish Hatchery.

- Location within Tennessee Location within the United States
- Location: Clay County, Tennessee, United States
- Coordinates: 36.54080651078283°N 85.45983840336827°W
- Area: 40 acres (16 ha)
- Established: 1965
- Visitors: 40,000
- Operator: United States Fish and Wildlife Service
- Website: www.fws.gov/fish-hatchery/dale-hollow

The Dale Hollow National Fish Hatchery is a fish hatchery administered by the United States Fish and Wildlife Service located in Clay County, Tennessee, in the United States. It mitigates losses of fishery resources caused by the construction of federal government dams as part of water development projects in the southeastern United States by raising brook trout (Salvelinus fontinalis), brown trout (Salmo trutta), lake trout (Salvelinus namaycush), and rainbow trout (Oncorhynchus mykiss) and stocking them in affected waters. It also engages in the conservation of threatened and endangered freshwater non-game fishes and freshwater mussels.

== Activities ==
=== Trout production ===
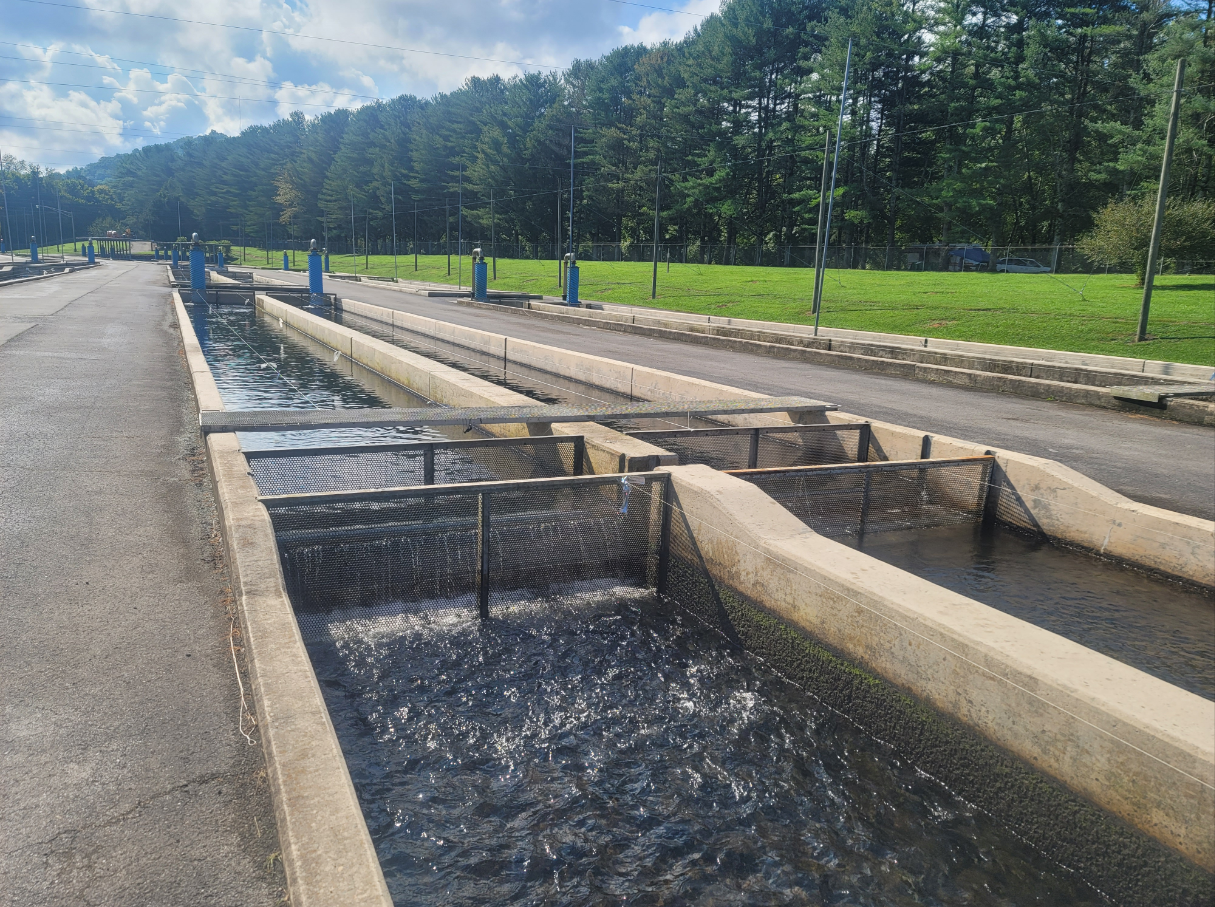
Raceways at the hatchery on October 26, 2022.

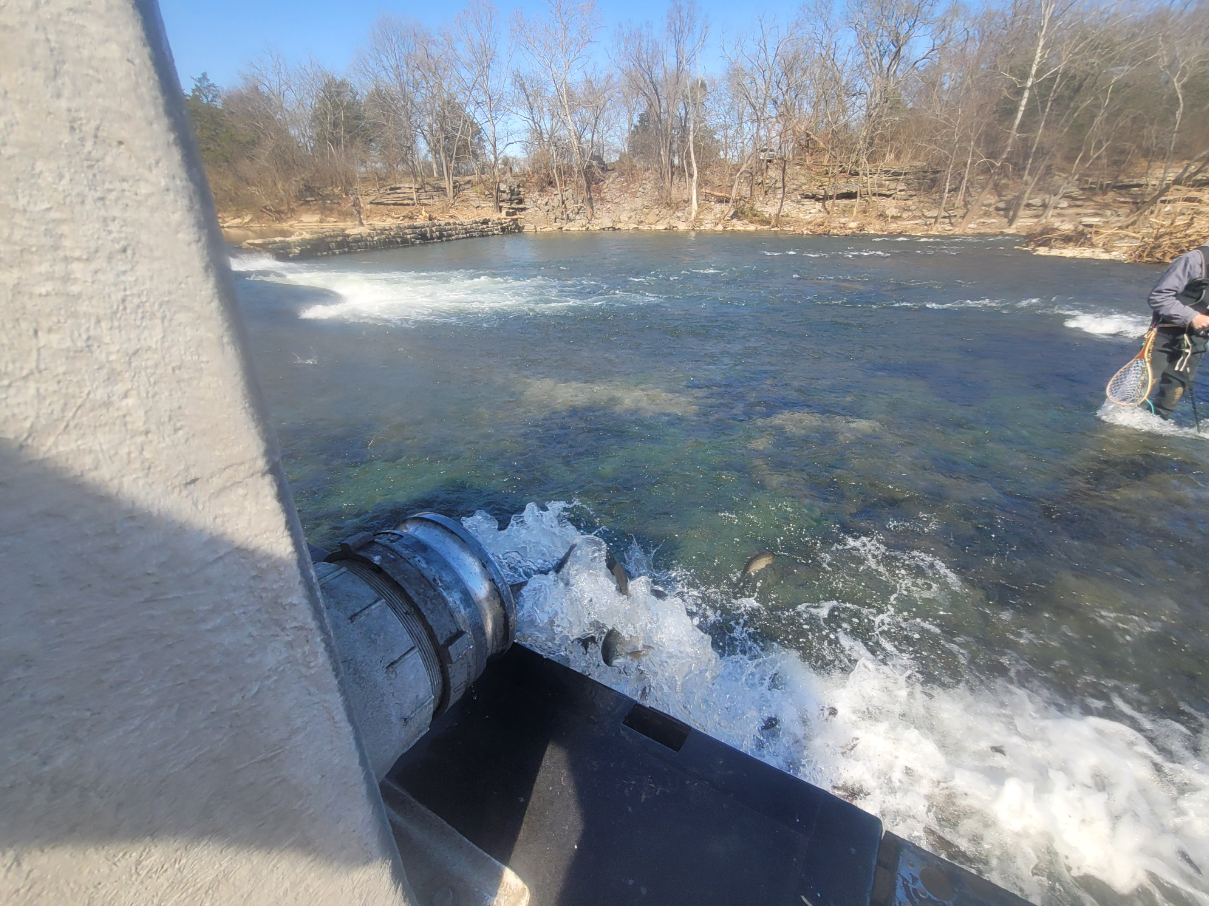
A truck from the hatchery stocks a river with trout on February 27, 2025.

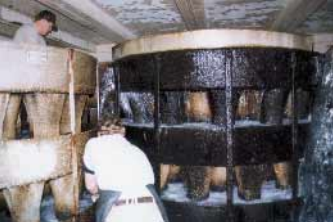
The interior of the hatchery's aerator building sometime during or before 2000.

The Dale Hollow National Fish Hatchery uses the Strategic Habitat Conservation (SHC) framework to manage fisheries resource priorities. It provides brook trout (Salvelinus fontinalis), brown trout (Salmo trutta), lake trout (Salvelinus namaycush), and rainbow trout (Oncorhynchus mykiss) for mitigation stocking – i.e., to compensate for lost fishery resources – in Tennessee. Bodies of water the hatchery has stocked for population loss mitigation purposes in Tennessee include J. Percy Priest Lake and its tailwater in the Stones River; the Center Hill Reservoir tailwater in the Caney Fork River; the Wolf River; the Dale Hollow Reservoir and its tailwater in the Obey River; the Normandy Reservoir tailwater in the Duck River; the Tims Ford Reservoir tailwater in the Elk River; the Appalachia Reservoir tailwater in the Hiwassee River; the Norris Reservoir tailwater in the Clinch River; the Tellico Reservoir; the Tellico River; the Calderwood Reservoir; the Chilhowee Reservoir; and a number of reservoirs and/or their tailwaters on the Holston River, namely the Cherokee Reservoir tailwater, the Fort Patrick Henry Reservoir and its tailwater, the South Holston Reservoir and its tailwater, the Wilbur Reservoir and its tailwater, the Watauga Reservoir, and the Boone Lake tailwater.

In addition to its mitigation work in Tennessee, the hatchery supplies fish to mitigate the negative effects of United States Government dam construction as part of water development projects in northern Georgia. In exchange for striped bass (Morone saxatilis) eggs and fry from the Gulf Coast of the United States, it also provides rainbow trout to Alabama to restore the population in the tailwater of the Lewis Smith Reservoir in the Sipsey River. On a reimbursable basis, the hatchery also provides a limited number of rainbow trout for non-mitigation stocking in the Red River in Tennessee near Fort Campbell under a cooperative agreement with the Tennessee Wildlife Resources Agency.

The Dale Hollow National Fish Hatchery does not spawn trout; instead, it receives fertilized trout eggs via overnight shipments from other hatcheries and places them in incubator trays. After the fry hatch, the hatchery staff places them in indoor tanks, where they receive food and care until they reach a length of 2 to 3 inches (5.1 to 7.6 cm). The staff then transfers the trout to outdoor raceways, where they remain until they are about 18 months old and have reached a length of 9 inches (22.9 cm). Hatchery personnel then weigh and harvest the fish and load them onto trucks which transport them to stocking sites or other hatcheries. The hatchery draws its water from the Dale Hollow Reservoir at a depth at which the water remains at a temperature of between 40 and 60 °F (4 and 16 °C) year-round; as of 2000, the hatchery drew this water from a depth of 75 feet (23 m), but as of 2017 this had increased to 90 feet (27 m). The water undergoes aeration to ensure it contains sufficient dissolved oxygen before it is pumped into the hatchery's tanks and raceways. In 2000, water flowed through the hatchery at a rate of 12,000 U.S. gallons (9,990 imperial gallons; 45,400 liters) per minute; by 2017, this had increased to 16,000 US gallons (13,300 imp gal; 60,600 L) per minute.

=== Threatened and endangered species ===
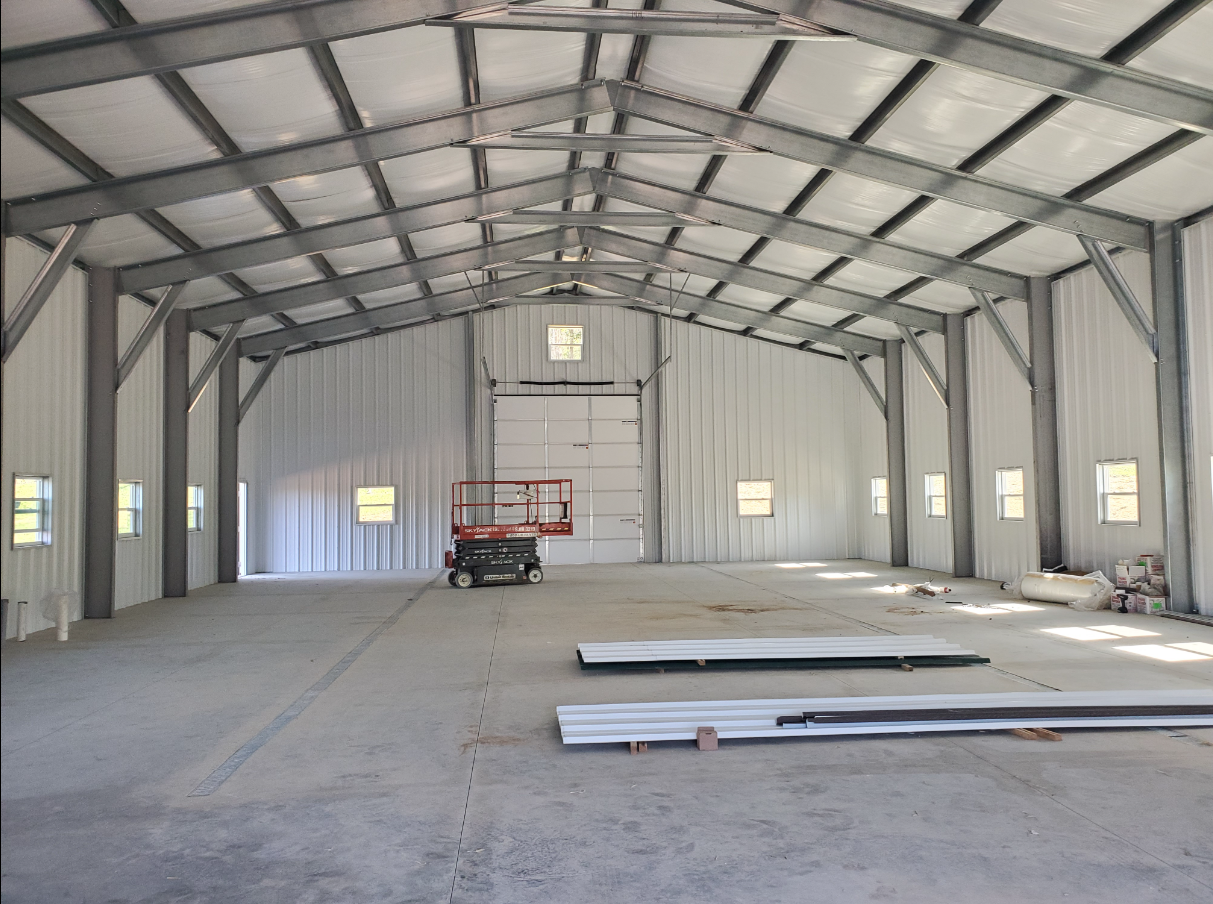
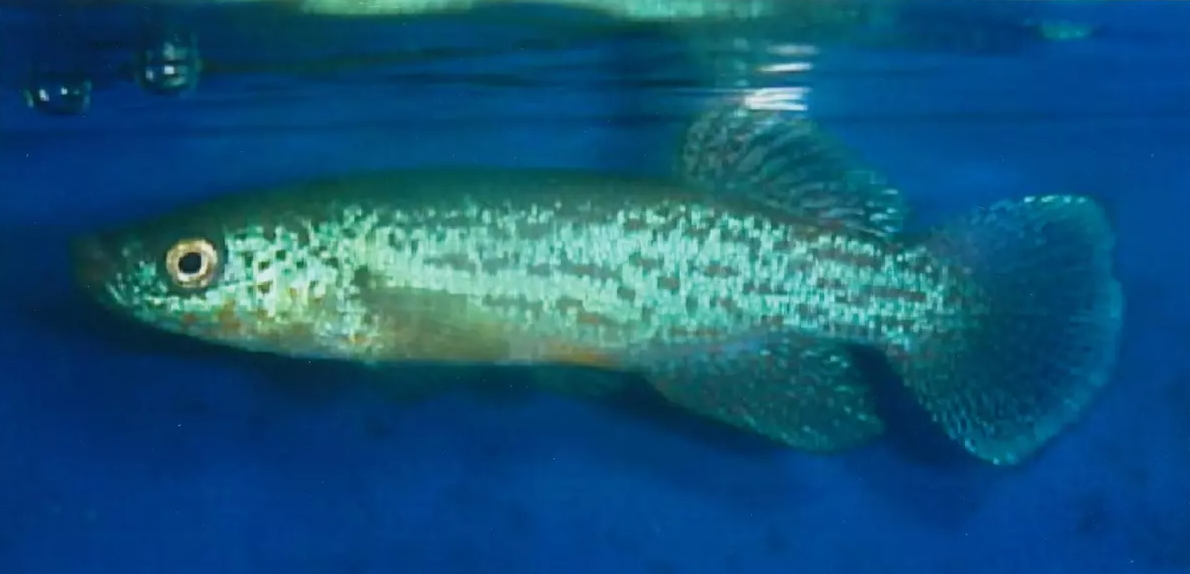
LEFT: The interior of the hatchery's threatened and endangered species building, used as a research and rearing space, seen on April 9, 2025.
RIGHT: A Barrens topminnow (Fundulus julisia).

In addition to its work with trout, the hatchery assists in the recovery and restoration of threatened and endangered freshwater species including non-game fishes and freshwater mussels. It develops propagation and culture techniques for such species, and releases the animals it raises into the wild to either reestablish populations in waters where they have become locally extinct or to augment existing wild populations of them.

==== Barrens topminnow ====
A particular focus of the hatchery is the preservation and reestablishment of the extremely rare Barrens topminnow (Fundulus julisia), which is native only to springs and spring-influenced streams on the Barrens Plateau in south-central Tennessee. During fiscal year 2016 (October 1, 2015–September 30, 2016), the hatchery distributed 69 Barrens topminnows hatched in 2012 to a stocking site located on private property in Warren County, Tennessee, and accepted from the Tennessee Aquarium 123 Barrens topminnows hatched in 2015 from the Elk River population, which the hatchery held as an "ark" population.

==== Freshwater mussels ====
Beginning in fiscal year 2000 (October 1, 1999–September 30, 2000), the Dale Hollow National Fish Hatchery took part in a three-year freshwater mussel culture project designed to transfer mussel culture technology from the Tennessee Cooperative Fishery Research Unit to the U.S. National Fish Hatchery System, specifically to the Dale Hollow facility in Tennessee and the Wolf Creek National Fish Hatchery in Kentucky. The hatchery attempted to grow juvenile mussels in closed, recirculation systems while feeding them algae grown in trout egg hatching jars. Like other mussel-holding facilities, the hatchery had problems keeping juvenile mussels alive for prolonged periods so that they could grow to a sufficient size to be reintroduced to natural waterways.

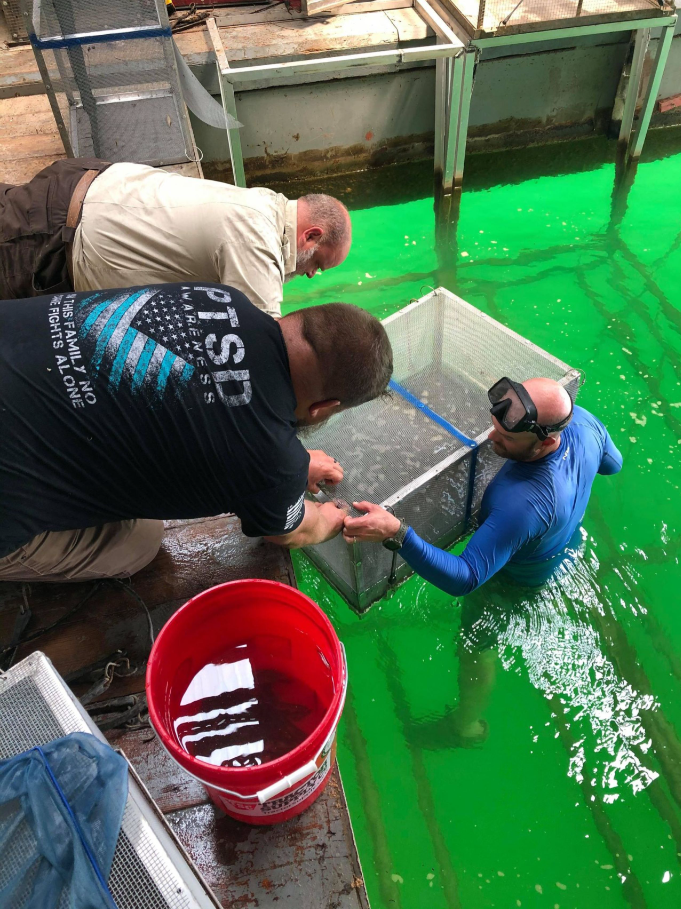
Personnel from the Dale Hollow and Erwin National Fish Hatcheries handle freshwater mussel cages in the boathouse in Dale Hollow Reservoir on 19 April 2022.

The hatchery renewed its mussel culture effort in 2013, partnering with the United States Army Corps of Engineers, Tennessee Cooperative Fishery Research Unit (Unit), United States Fish and Wildlife Service Ecological Services Field Office, Tennessee Wildlife Resources Agency, and Friends of Dale Hollow National Fish Hatchery as well as the Natchitoches National Fish Hatchery in Louisiana in a new project that attempted to culture mussels in cages suspended in the Dale Hollow Reservoir, allowing them to filter their own food naturally from the water rather than being fed algae. In the project, the TWRA employed electrofishing techniques from boats in April 2013 to collect spotted bass (Micropterus punctulatus) from the reservoir for use as hosts for glochidia (microscopic parasitic mussel larvae which infest the gills of host fish). The fish were transported to the hatchery where, two weeks later, Tennessee Cooperative Fishery Research Unit personnel infested half of them with glochidia of the mucket (Actinonaias ligamentina, genus Actinonaias) and half with glochidia of the pink mucket (Lampsilis abrupta). Three weeks later, the host fish were moved from the hatchery to Dale Hollow Reservoir, where they were placed in cages suspended beneath a U.S. Army Corps of Engineers boathouse. Over the next three weeks, the glochidia transformed into juvenile mussels and settled into sand at the bottom of the cages, after which the former host fish were released into the reservoir. The mussels grew in the cages for another five months until October 2013, when they were harvested, the harvest yielding 22 muckets, eight pink muckets, and four non-endangered plain pocketbooks (Lampsilis cardium) which apparently had infested the host fish prior to their capture the previous April. The mussels displayed surprising growth while in the cages during this first trial. The harvested mussels were sent to the Ohio River Islands National Wildlife Refuge to help in the recovery of populations severely affected by a 1999 chemical spill.

A second culture trial began in the spring of 2014 when TWRA electrofishing boats again collected spotted bass from Dale Hollow Reservoir and the Eagle Bend State Fish Hatchery provided walleye (Sander vitreus) to the Dale Hollow National Fish Hatchery. Using somewhat altered water quality management procedures, Tennessee Cooperative Fishery Research Unit personnel infested the spotted bass with glochidia from the pink mucket and the walleye with glochidia from the black sandshell (Ligumia recta). The host fish were placed in suspended cages beneath the boathouse in May 2014. In addition, a cage containing saugers (Sander canadensis) infested with black sandshell glochidia and maintained at the lab at Tennessee Technological University was suspended, as was a cage containing pink mucket juveniles placed directly onto the sand substrate. After four months, the mussels were harvested in September 2014, with the staff noting that some of the sand substrate had washed out of the cages. The harvest yielded 601 black sandshell juveniles, mostly from the sauger cages, but no pink muskets. The harvested mussels again went to the Ohio River Islands National Wildlife Refuge.

As of 2015, the hatchery planned to conduct a third trial, using black bass and walleye as host fish for black sandshell and pink musket glochidia and experimenting with means of preventing sand from washing out of the cages. Harvest was expected in September or October 2015, with harvested mussels again to be used in the ongoing Ohio River Islands National Wildlife Refuge restoration and recovery efforts. By 2023, the hatchery was experimenting with raising 14 species of freshwater mussel, and it harvested 2,865 mussels that year, including Duck River dartersnappers (Epioblasma ahlstedti), sheepnose mussels (Plethobasus cyphyus), round hickorynuts (Obovaria subrotunda), pale lilliput pearlymussels (Toxolasma cylindrellus), rough pigtoes (Pleurobema plenum), pink muckets, Cumberland moccasinshells (Medionidus conradicus), and purple cat's paws (Epioblasma obliquata).

=== Other activities ===
The hatchery assists Native American tribal governments in managing fisheries resources on tribal lands. It also works with the Tennessee Wildlife Resources Agency to ensure a thorough, perennial hatchery product evaluation program.

The hatchery engages in various outreach activities, providing recreational fishing opportunities through Project Healing Waters — a program for wounded members and veterans of the United States Armed Forces — and environmental education opportunities. It also maintains a pollinator garden for the benefit of migrating monarch butterflies (Danaus plexippus).

== History ==
The U.S. Army Corps of Engineers completed the Dale Hollow Dam on the Obey River in 1943. The dam created the Dale Hollow Reservoir, a deep lake in which water stratifies into layers with differing temperatures each summer. Water released downstream into the Obey River comes from a deep, cool layer, replacing the warm-water environment that had prevailed in the tailwater below the dam prior to the dam's construction with a cold-water environment, with a negative effect on the game fish populations in the tailwater.

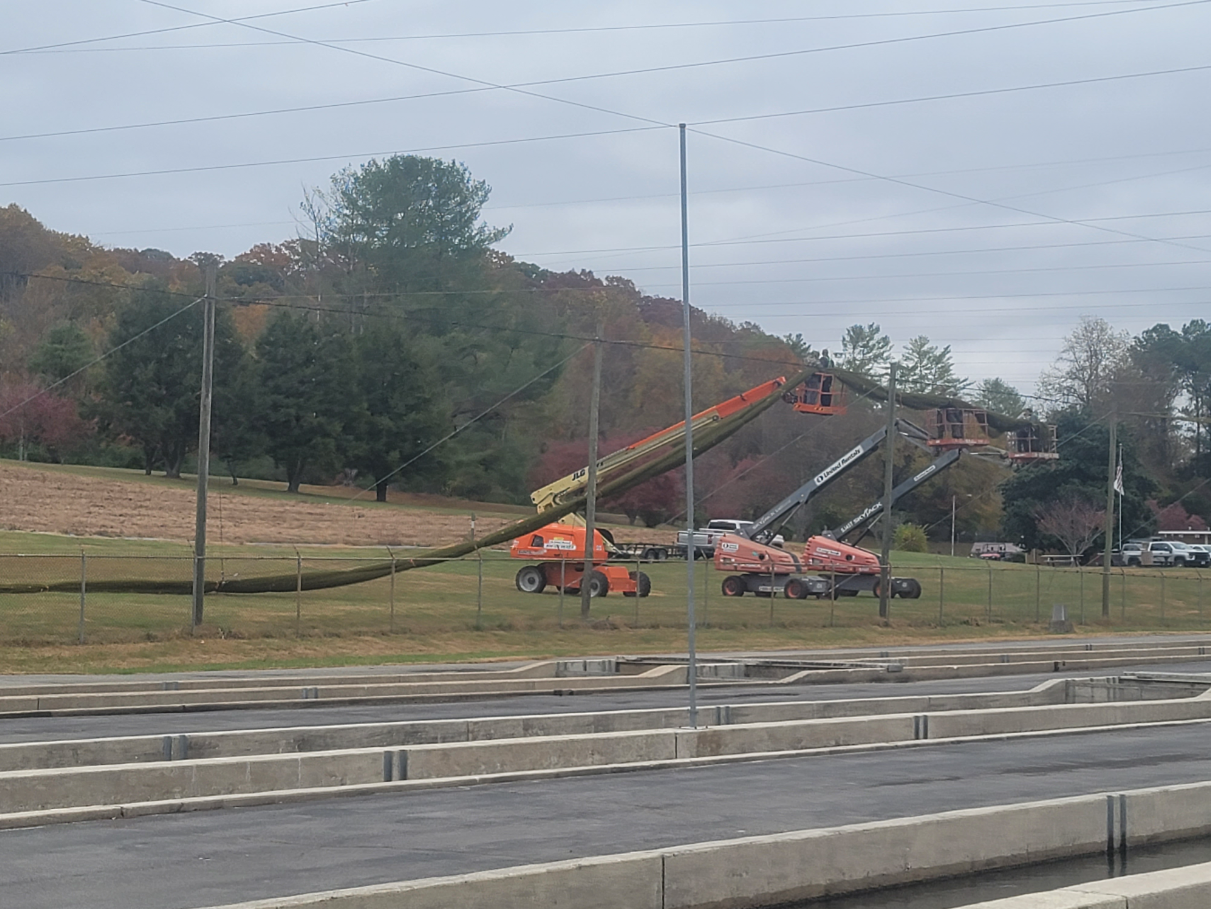
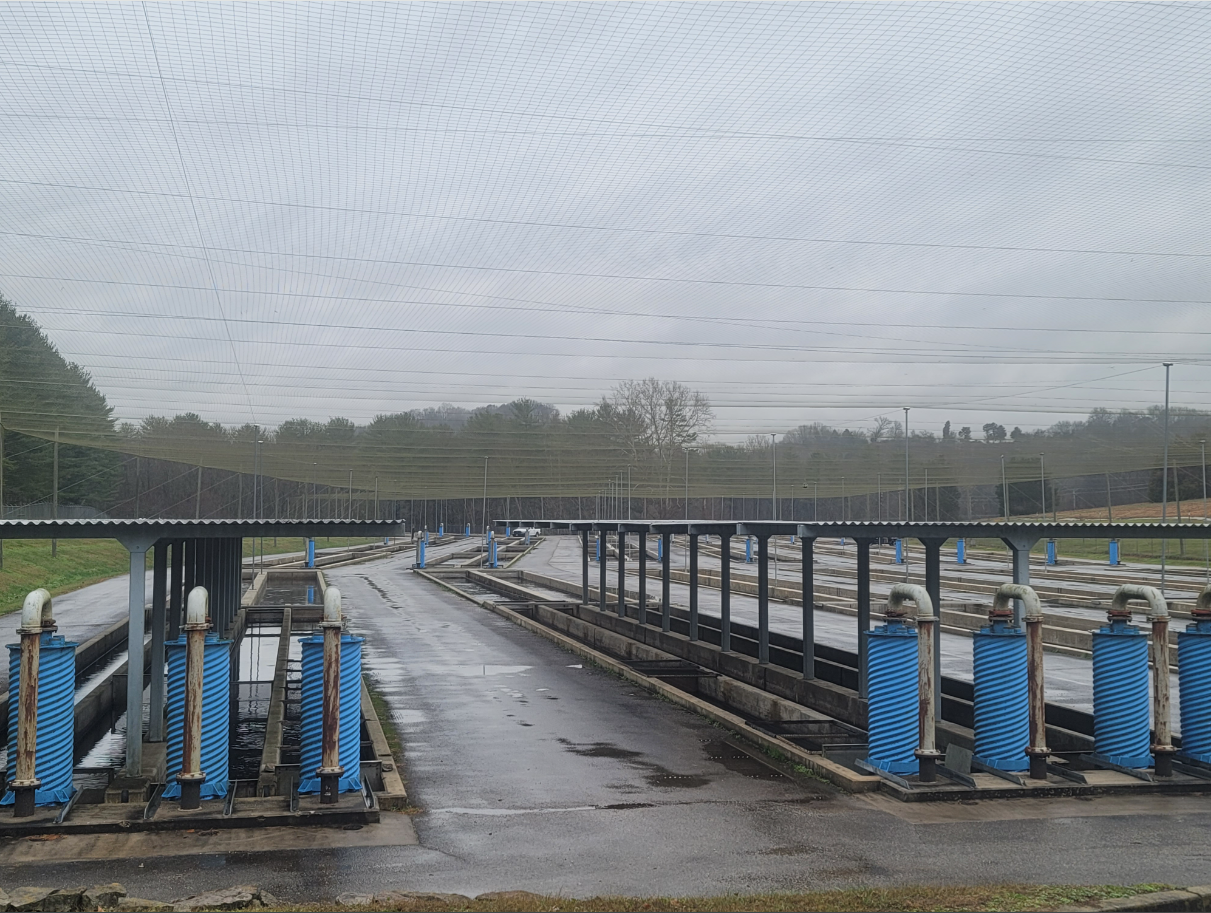
LEFT: The installation of new bird netting. RIGHT: The completed bird netting over the central portion of the raceways.

The Dale Hollow National Fish Hatchery was established in 1965 on land leased from the U.S. Army Corps of Engineers just below the Dale Hollow Dam to raise brown, lake, and rainbow trout and stock them in the Dale Hollow Reservoir tailwater in the Obey River to mitigate population losses resulting from the dam's construction, as well as to produce fish for other reservoirs and their tailwaters. By 2000, the hatchery was distributing 1.5 million brown, lake, and rainbow with a total weight of 300,000 pounds (140,000 kilograms) in Tennessee and neighboring states. By 2017, the hatchery was producing 325,000 pounds (147,000 kilograms) of trout, which it distributed both for mitigation purposes and, to a limited extent, for non-mitigation of some waters under cooperative agreements with other agencies. During the 21st century, the hatchery also has assisted in preservation and recovery efforts for endangered populations of non-game fish and freshwater mussels.

Eighteen years after its installation, bird netting over the hatchery's outdoor raceways suffered structural failure in 2020. The hatchery engaged in a cooperative effort with the United States Department of Agriculture's Animal and Plant Health Inspection Service in Nashville, Tennessee, for repairs. The work resulted in the installation of an improved, more robust netting system over the raceways.

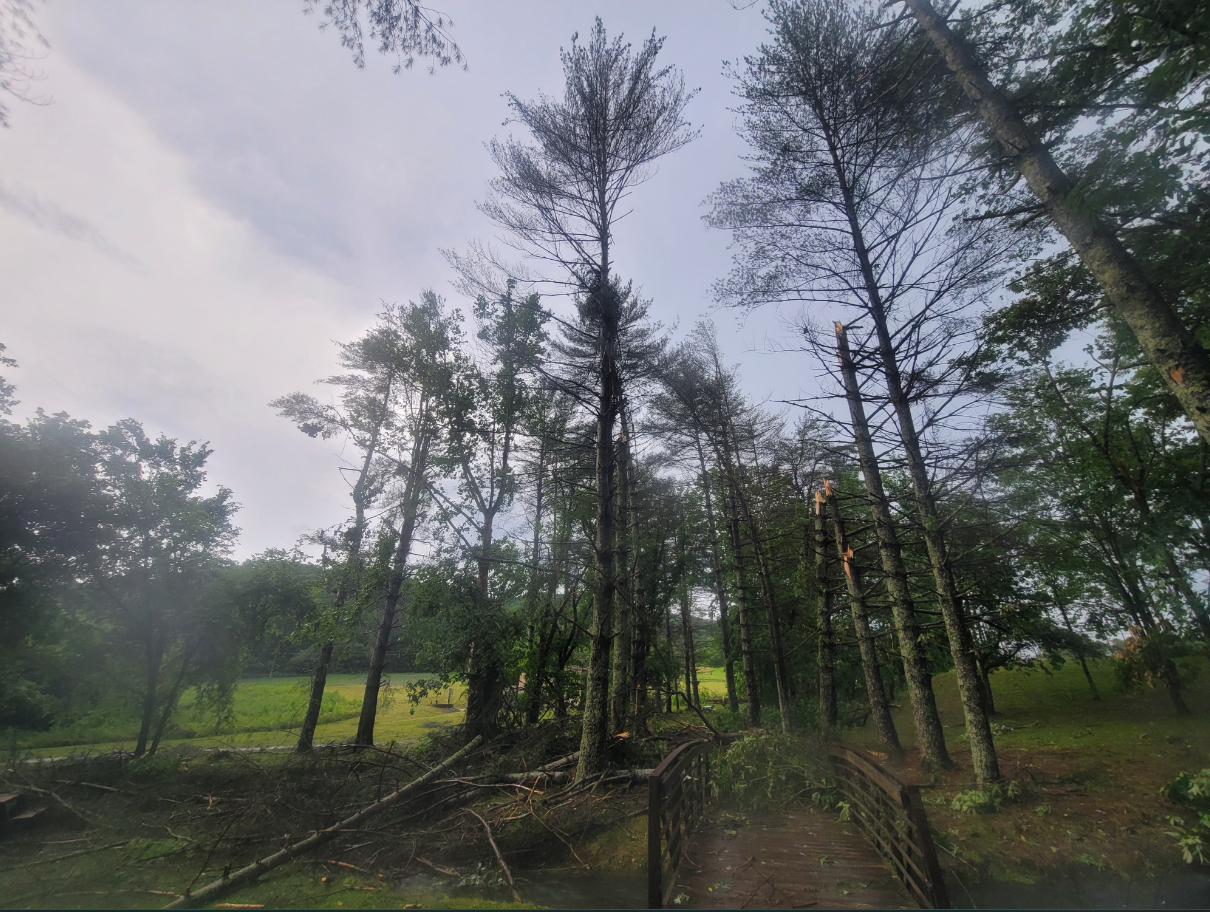
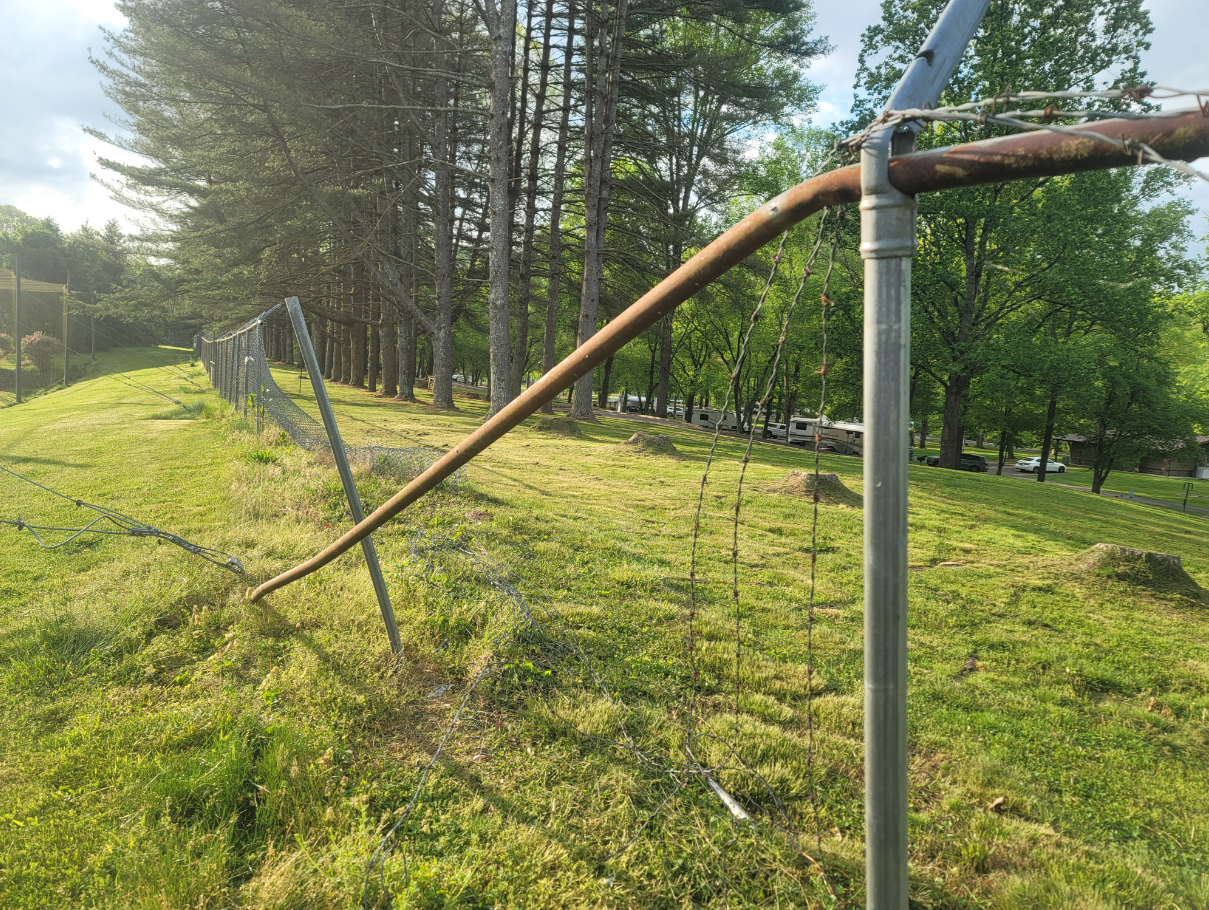
Damage from the June 11, 2023, windstorm. LEFT: Downed and compromised trees in the public fishing area on July 21, 2023. RIGHT: The destroyed fence on April 24, 2024.

On June 11, 2023, a severe windstorm — described as a "sub-tornado" — with winds of around 60 miles per hour (97 km/h) and perhaps as high as 70 miles per hour (113 km/h) began at the Obey River and left a trail of damaged and destroyed trees as it passed through the center of the Dale Hollow Damsite campground adjacent to the southern edge of the hatchery grounds, along the southern side of the hatchery, through the creek fishing area where the hatchery holds public events, up through the tail end of the effluent area, and up a hill across from the hatchery entrance. No one was injured, but falling trees crushed the hatchery's southern chain-link fence and the hatchery itself suffered minor flooding and damage. The storm felled 55 short tons (49 long tons; 50 metric tons) of trees and tree limbs, and downed and dangerously compromised trees forced the closure of the public fishing area along the creek. After completing priority repairs and clean-up over the next four weeks, the hatchery embarked on a low-cost effort to complete repairs and clean-up using hatchery staff, volunteers, and local contractors. The work also addressed damage sustained on hatchery property in earlier storms, repairs to the hatchery's fishing pier, and the replacement of 1,200 linear feet (366 meters) of fencing and of a dilapidated footbridge over the hatchery's stream. The work was completed in late 2024.

By 2024, the hatchery was producing 1.2 to 1.6 million fish per year for mitigation purposes, focusing on brook, brown, and rainbow trout, as well as some projects involving lake trout and cutthroat trout (Oncorhynchus clarkii ). It also was engaged in the culture of 14 species of freshwater mussel and the Barrens topminnow.

== Management ==
The United States Fish and Wildlife Service operates the Dale Hollow National Fish Hatchery. The hatchery partners with chambers of commerce, U.S. state tourism departments, and other agencies to promote both itself and support for recreational fishing in the southeastern United States. It maintains a nonprofit organization, Friends of the Dale Hollow National Fish Hatchery, both as a source of volunteers to support hatchery activities and to gain community support for the hatchery.

Volunteers play a large role in the hatchery's operations and activities, cleaning raceways and fish tanks, fixing aquaculture equipment, moving and feeding fish, engaging in groundskeeping, providing visitor tours, and assisting with outreach efforts including education, children's games, community interaction, and social media updates. Via the Friends of the Dale Hollow National Fish Hatchery group, volunteers also provide expertise in legal, administrative, bookkeeping, organizational, and educational activities, as well as in aquaculture, agriculture, and various trades.

== Recreation ==
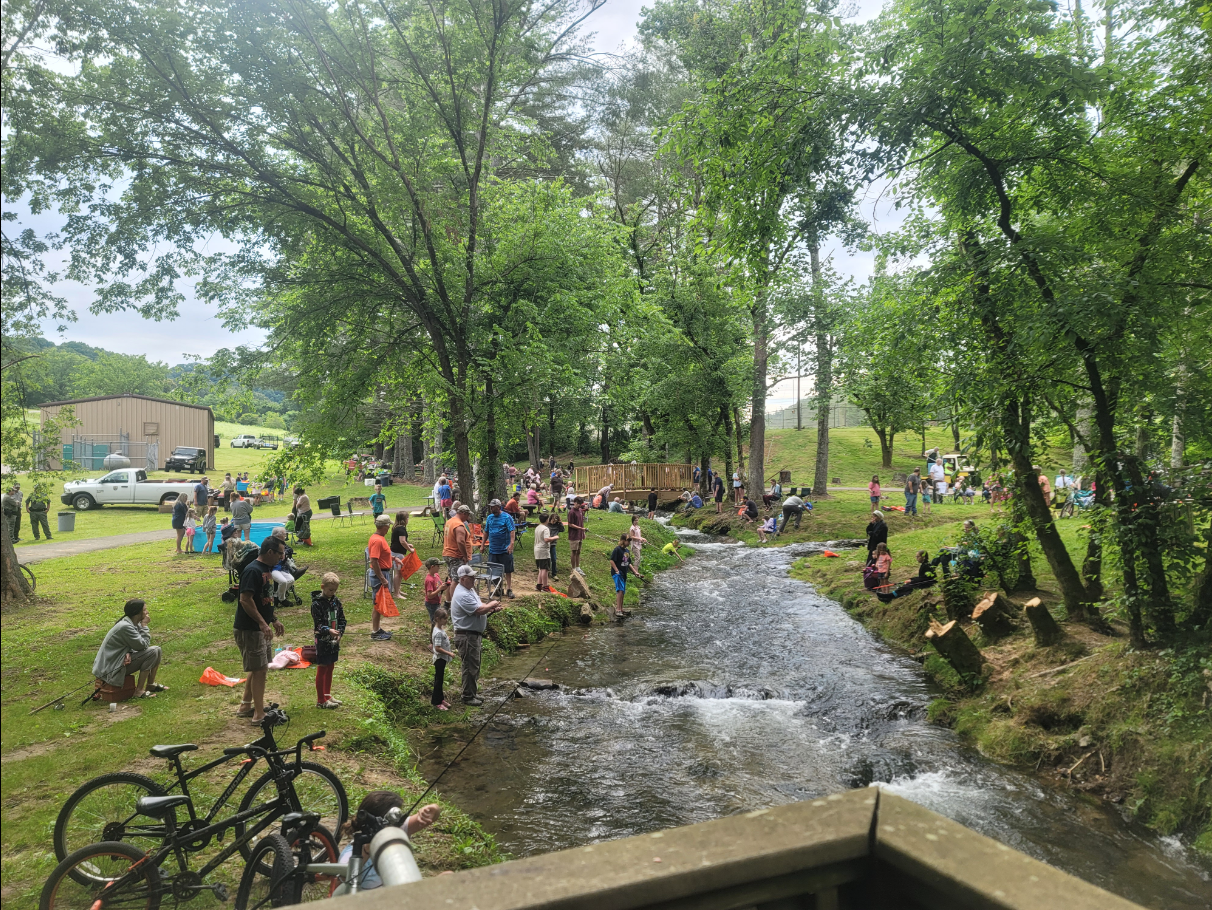
The annual Kids Fishing Rodeo on June 8, 2024.

The Dale Hollow National Fish Hatchery is open to public on weekdays and hosts about 40,000 visitors a year who can tour the hatchery, get guided education, and fish in the hatchery's stream. The hatchery accepts reservations for group tours. It has a visitors center and public aquarium which has five tanks displaying species that were native to the Obey River prior to the construction of the Dale Hollow Dam. The hatchery's grounds cover an area of 40 acres (16 hectares) and include a paved exercise and walking road. The 0.18-mile (0.29 km) Campground Trail leads from a trailhead in the adjacent Dam Hollow Damsite campground and crosses onto the hatchery grounds, where it offers opportunities for nature viewing. A public fishing area with a fishing pier lies on the grounds, and the hatchery stocks the stream in the fishing area with rainbow trout weekly.

The hatchery and the Friends of Dale Hollow National Fish Hatchery host three to seven outreach and education events per year, including fishing derbies, fly fishing events, and lake boating safety events. Annual events at the hatchery include an Kids Fishing Rodeo every June, a Wilderness Day Camp each July, and a Project Healing Waters Fly Fishing Event in August.

== See also ==
- National Fish Hatchery System
- List of National Fish Hatcheries in the United States
