= Dale Hollow =

Dale Hollow may refer to:

- Dale Hollow National Fish Hatchery, a component of the National Fish Hatchery System in Tennessee in the United States
- Dale Hollow Reservoir, sometimes called Dale Hollow Lake, an artificial lake behind Dale Hollow Dam on the border between Kentucky and Tennessee in the United States
- Dale Hollow Lake State Park, a park on the shore of the Dale Hollow Reservoir in Kentucky in the United States
