= Erwin National Fish Hatchery =

Fish hatchery in Tennessee, United States

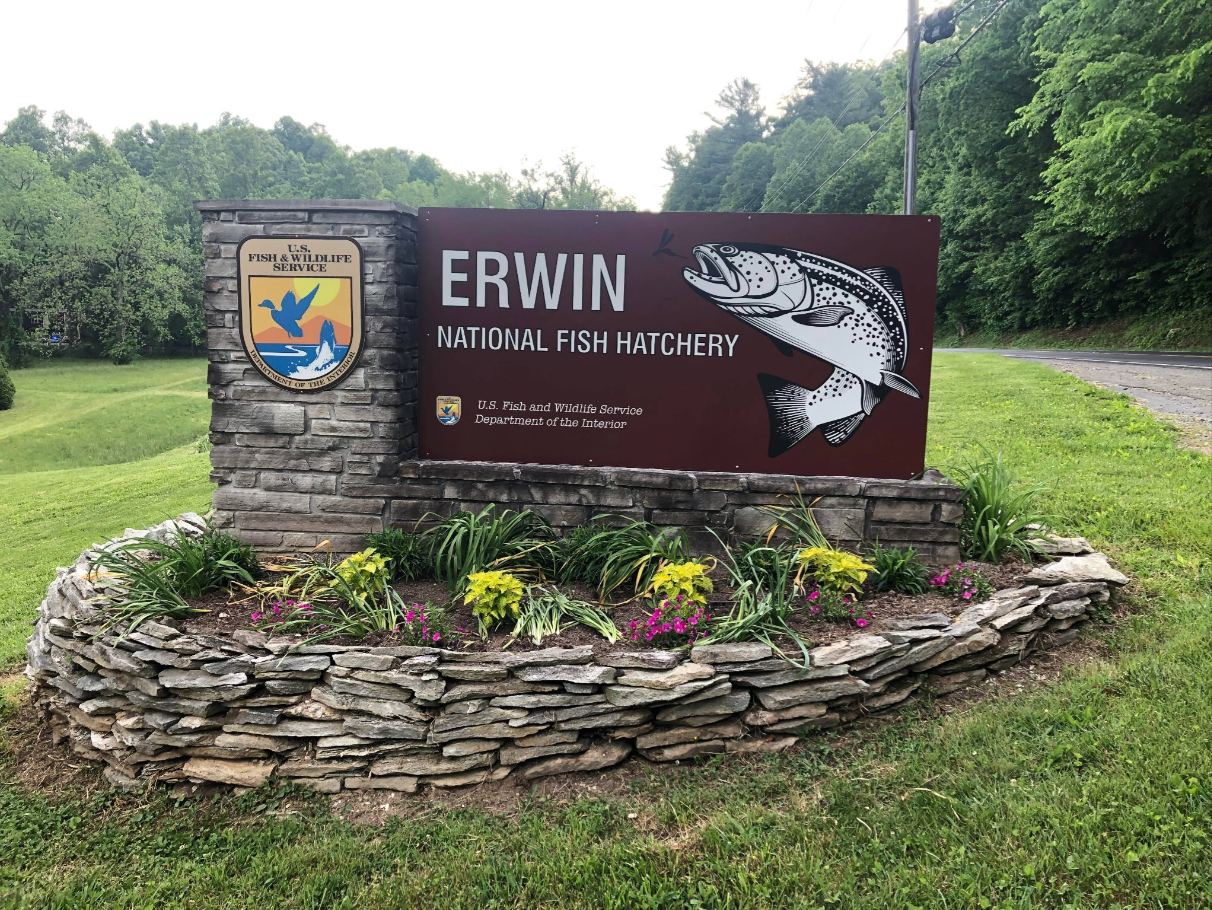

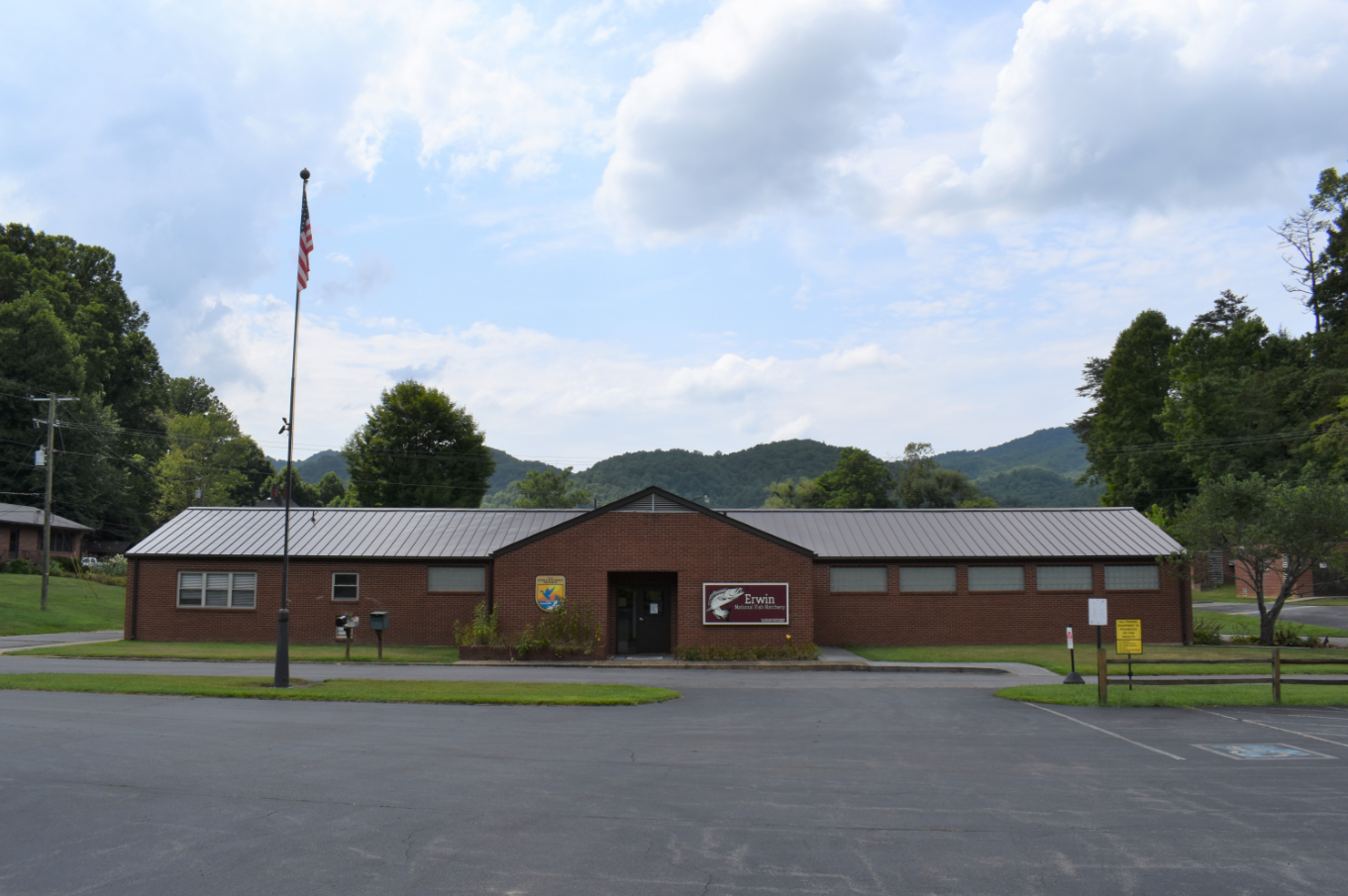
- The Erwin National Fish Hatchery on March 14, 2022.

- Location within Tennessee Location within the United States
- Location: Erwin, Tennessee, United States
- Coordinates: 36.1655022°N 82.3882677°W
- Named for: Erwin, Tennessee
- Governing body: United States Fish and Wildlife Service
- Website: www.fws.gov/fish-hatchery/erwin

The Erwin National Fish Hatchery is a fish hatchery administered by the United States Fish and Wildlife Service located in Erwin, Tennessee, in the United States. It opened in 1897 and is one of the oldest United States Government facilities in the National Fish Hatchery System. It is a major producer of brook trout (Salvelinus fontinalis) and rainbow trout (Oncorhynchus mykiss) eggs for the stocking of waterways in the southeastern United States, and also is involved in the preservation and restoration of threatened and endangered species in the region.

== History ==
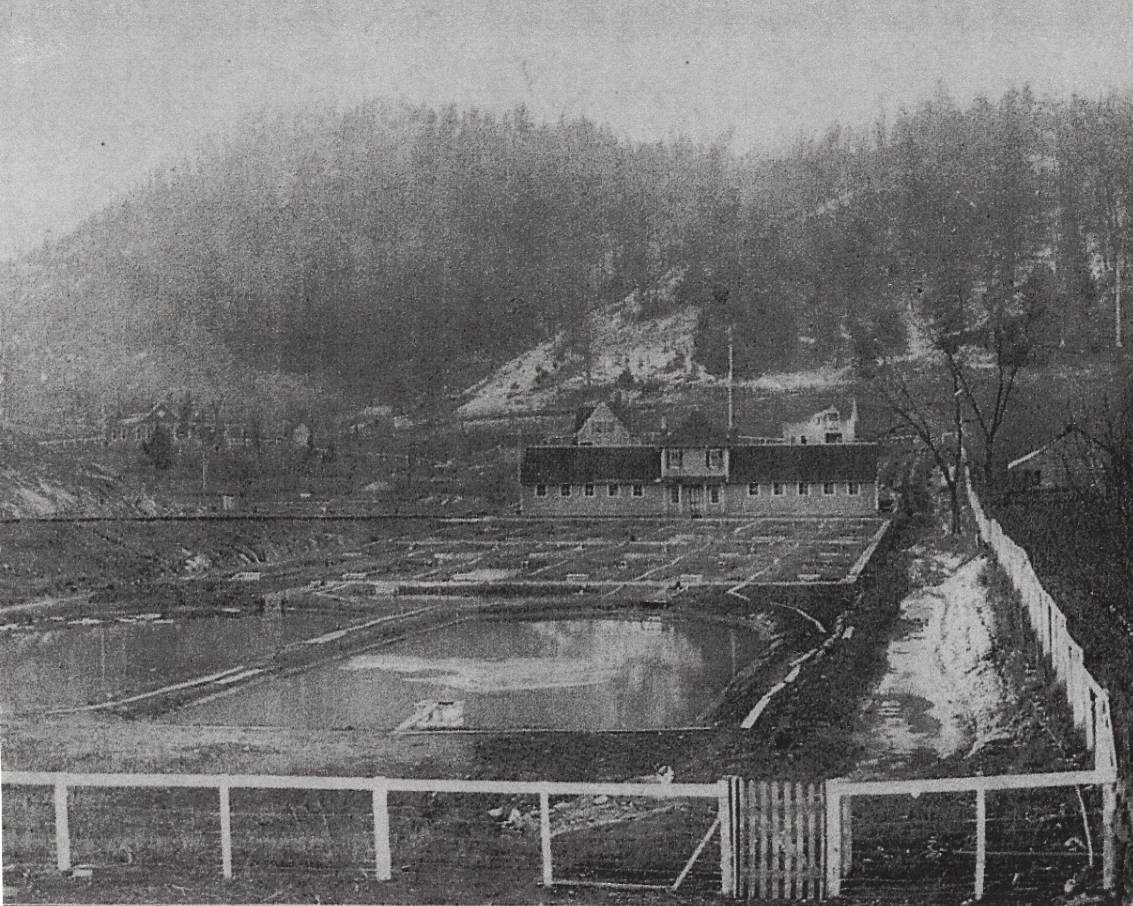
The original hatchery building and fish ponds, ca. 1899.

The United States Congress created the United States Commission on Fish and Fisheries, widely referred to informally as the United States Fish Commission, in 1871 to study and manage the fishery resources of the United States. The same year, it established the National Fish Hatchery System as an element of the Fish Commission. On August 8, 1894, an Act of Congress authorized the establishment of a fish culture facility to restore trout populations in Tennessee, North Carolina, and Virginia. In 1896, the Fish Commission dispatched agents to Tennessee to identify a suitable location to establish the facility. Later in 1896, the agents recommended a site in the Appalachian Mountains in Erwin in eastern Tennessee near the North Carolina border, noting both an abundance of fresh water flowing from a number of high-output springs there and the site's proximity to a railroad. The Fish Commission approved the recommendation. Construction of the facility — named the Erwin National Fish Hatchery — started in the spring of 1897, and it began operations in the fall of 1897. Initially, it consisted of a hatchery building, outbuildings, two residential buildings to house staff, and eight fish ponds.

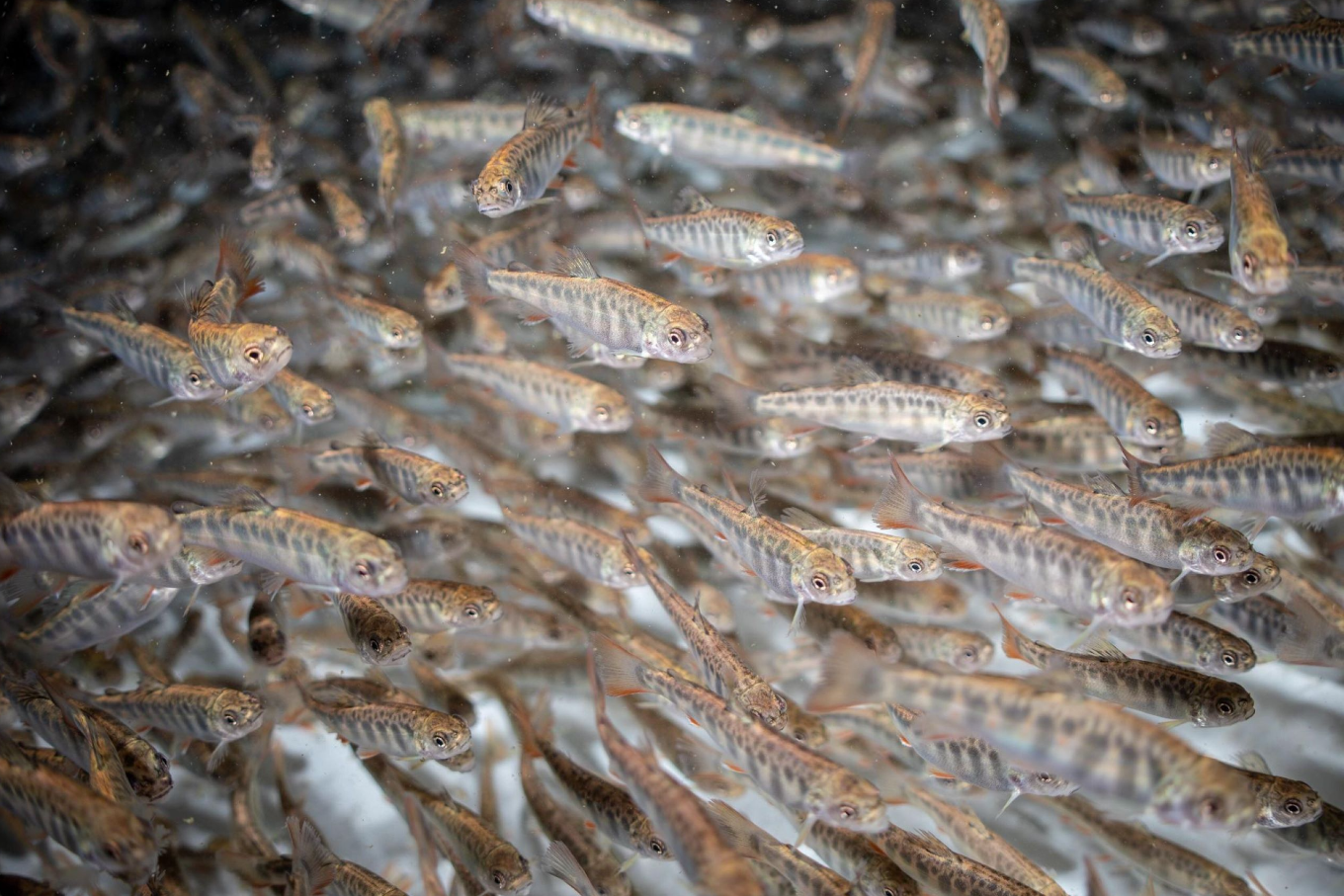
Brook trout (Salvelinus fontinalis) fingerlings at the hatchery.

The first fish arrived at the hatchery in November 1897, and during its first season the facility received 2,989 brook trout (Salvelinus fontinalis) for use as broodstock, but a high mortality rate among the fish — much of it due to predation by feral cats — ensued and the hatchery produced no eggs that year. In 1898, the hatchery received shipments of rainbow trout (Oncorhynchus mykiss) fingerlings and eggs from a national fish hatchery in Wytheville, Virginia, and brook trout eggs from East Freetown, Massachusetts, but again experienced low survival rates of fish and eggs due to high nitrogen levels in the spring water and predation by snakes and other species. The hatchery's employees learned from their mistakes, however, and soon achieved success, raising approximately 40,000 rainbow trout and 30,000 brook trout in 1900.

During its early years, the hatchery was served primarily by trains which transported fish in specially equipped "fish cars" in which fish culturists manually aerated water and used ice as necessary to cool it to keep fish alive while they were aboard the trains. A special railroad siding was constructed at the hatchery so these specialized railcars could load cargoes of fish; the railroad stop at the hatchery also served as the United States Post Office for "Fishery, Tennessee." A hatchery office building was constructed in 1901, and a house for the hatchery's superintendent was built in 1903; one of the grandest homes in Unicoi County, Tennessee, and officially referred to as "Quarters No. 1," it became known as the Morefield House. The original hatchery building fell into disrepair, so in 1909 a new hatchery building replaced it. The hatchery converted some of its ponds into concrete raceways and acquired more land, allowing it to construct ponds for warm-water fish culture on the west side of the railroad tracks.

The hatchery primarily stocked fisheries in eastern Tennessee, western North Carolina, and three counties in Virginia. From the early 1900s into the 1940s, the hatchery raised no fewer than 16 species of fish, including brook trout, rainbow trout, brown trout (Salmo trutta), lake trout (Salvelinus namaycush), bluegill (Lepomis macrochirus), catfish (order Siluriformes), largemouth bass (Micropterus nigricans), smallmouth bass (Micropterus dolomieu), rock bass (Ambloplites rupestris), crappie (genus Pomoxis), yellow perch (Perca flavescens), goldfish (Carassius auratus), silver shiners (Notropis photogenis), whitetail shiners (Cyprinella galactura), golden shiners (Notemigonus crysoleucas), and northern hogsuckers (Hypentelium nigricans).

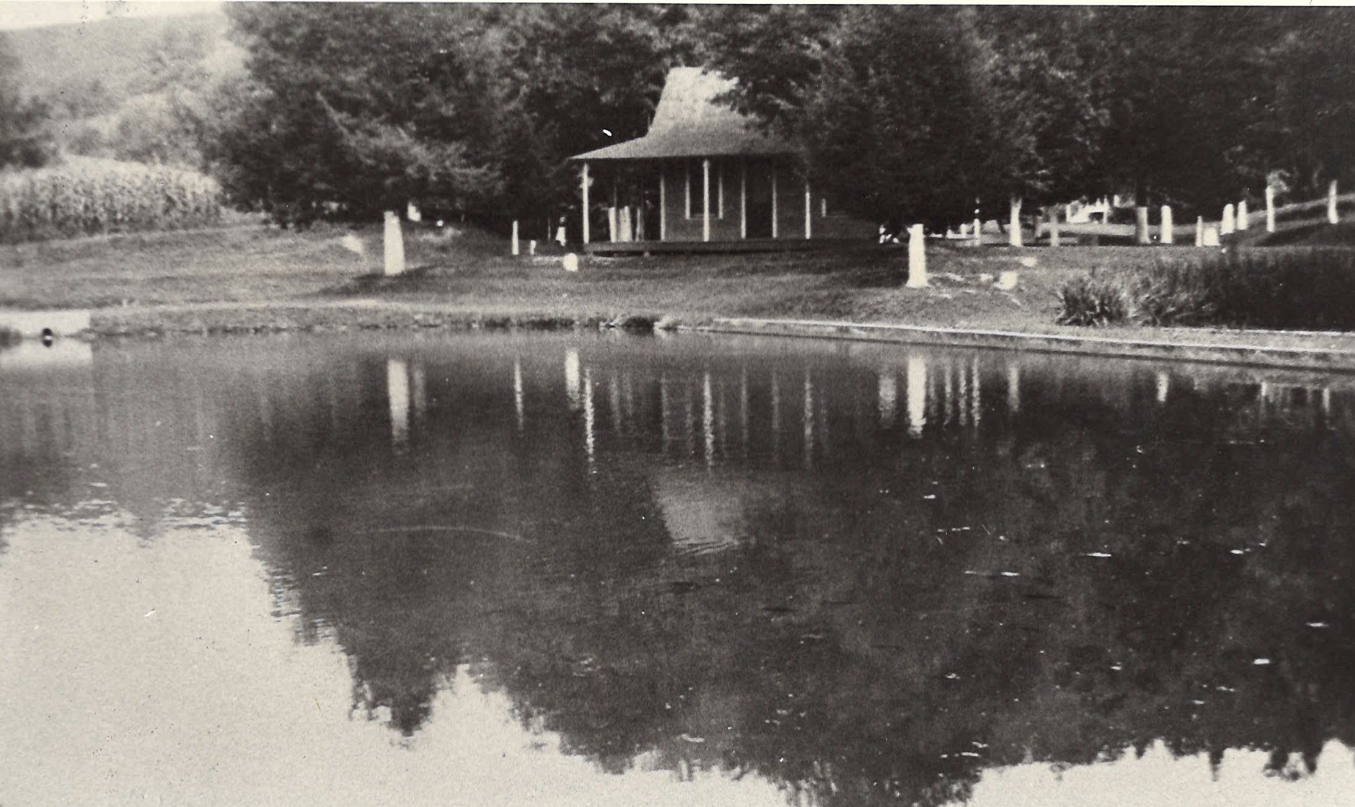
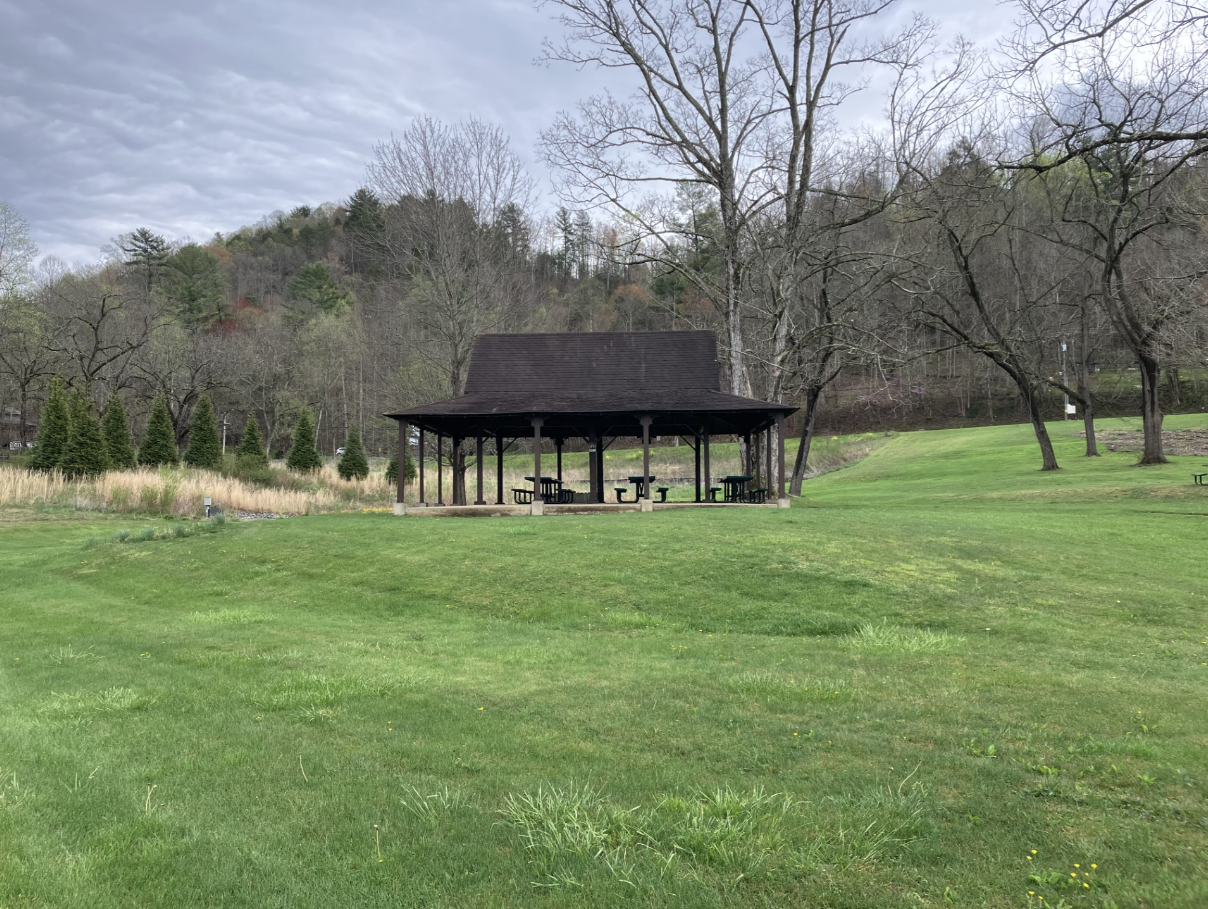
LEFT: The original hatchery office building, ca. 1901. It overlooked a fish pond. RIGHT: The building was converted into a picnic shelter during the 1950s.

The hatchery continued to operate as the Fish Commission became the Bureau of Fisheries in 1903, merged with other agencies to form the United States Department of the Interior's Fish and Wildlife Service in 1940, and underwent a major reorganization to become the United States Fish and Wildlife Service (USFWS) in 1956, under which it has operated ever since. In the 1940s the hatchery reduced the number of species it raised and began focusing on rainbow trout, brown trout, brook trout, bluegill, largemouth bass, and smallmouth bass. In the 1950s, it cut back further on the number of species and began to focus solely on the propagation of trout to restore trout populations and support recreational fishing.

The 1901 hatchery office building was converted into a picnic shelter during the 1950s. By the end of the 1950s the hatchery had converted all of the ponds on the eastern side of the railroad tracks into raceways, and added a feed building, a five-bay garage, and an oil house. The most recent hatchery building was built in 1961, and the hatchery's pump house for reuse water, generator building, and only remaining staff quarters house were added in the 1960s. In the 1960s, the hatchery expanded its stocking responsibilities to include Cumberland County, Kentucky.

In 1970, the USFWS identified a need for stable sources of trout eggs and created its National Broodstock Program. In 1976, the Erwin National Fish Hatchery officially became part of the program and began to provide disease-free eggs to United States Government, state government, and Native American tribal hatcheries. Since then, it has served as one of the program's primary broodstock facilities, providing approximately 16 million certified disease-free trout eggs annually to hatcheries around the United States.

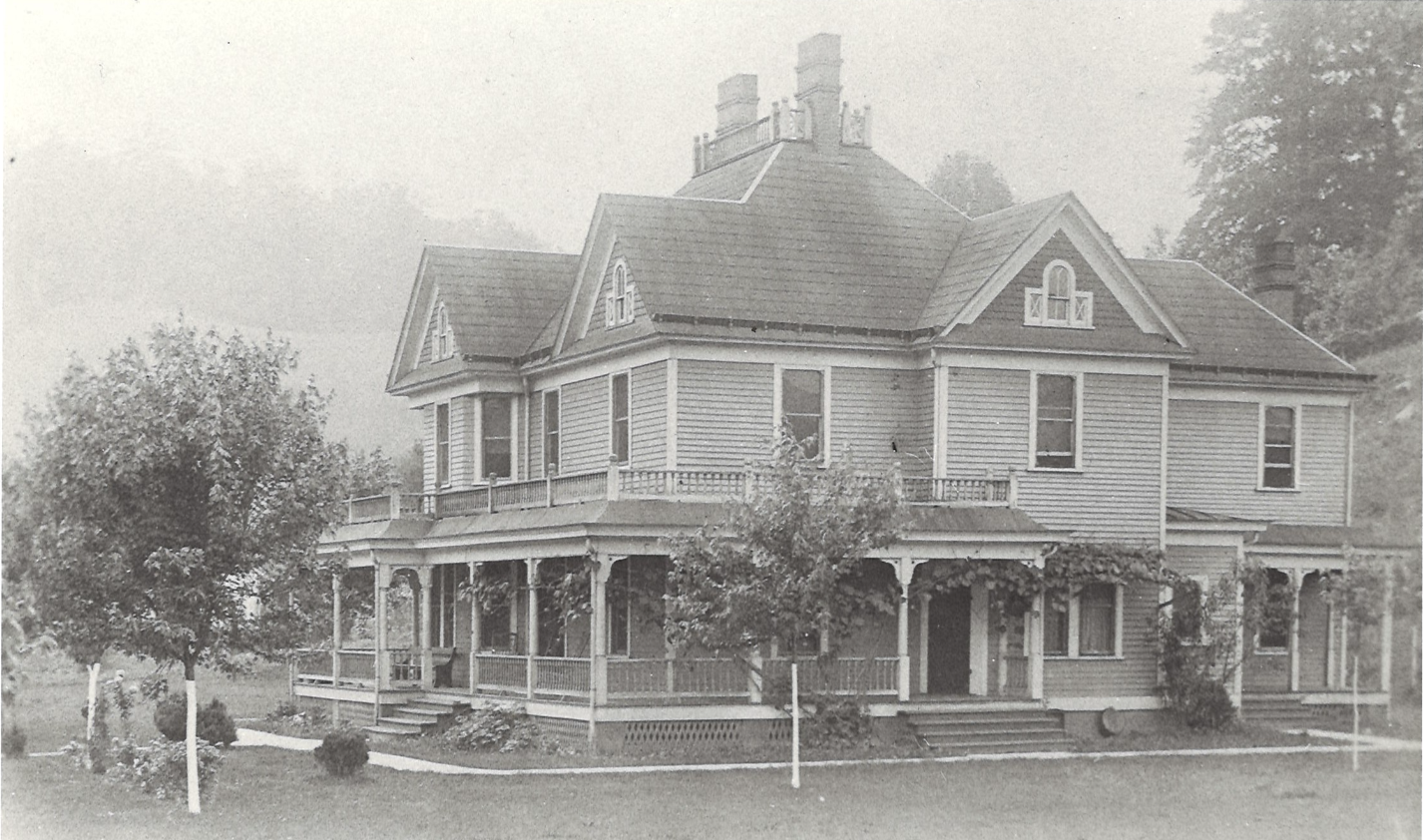
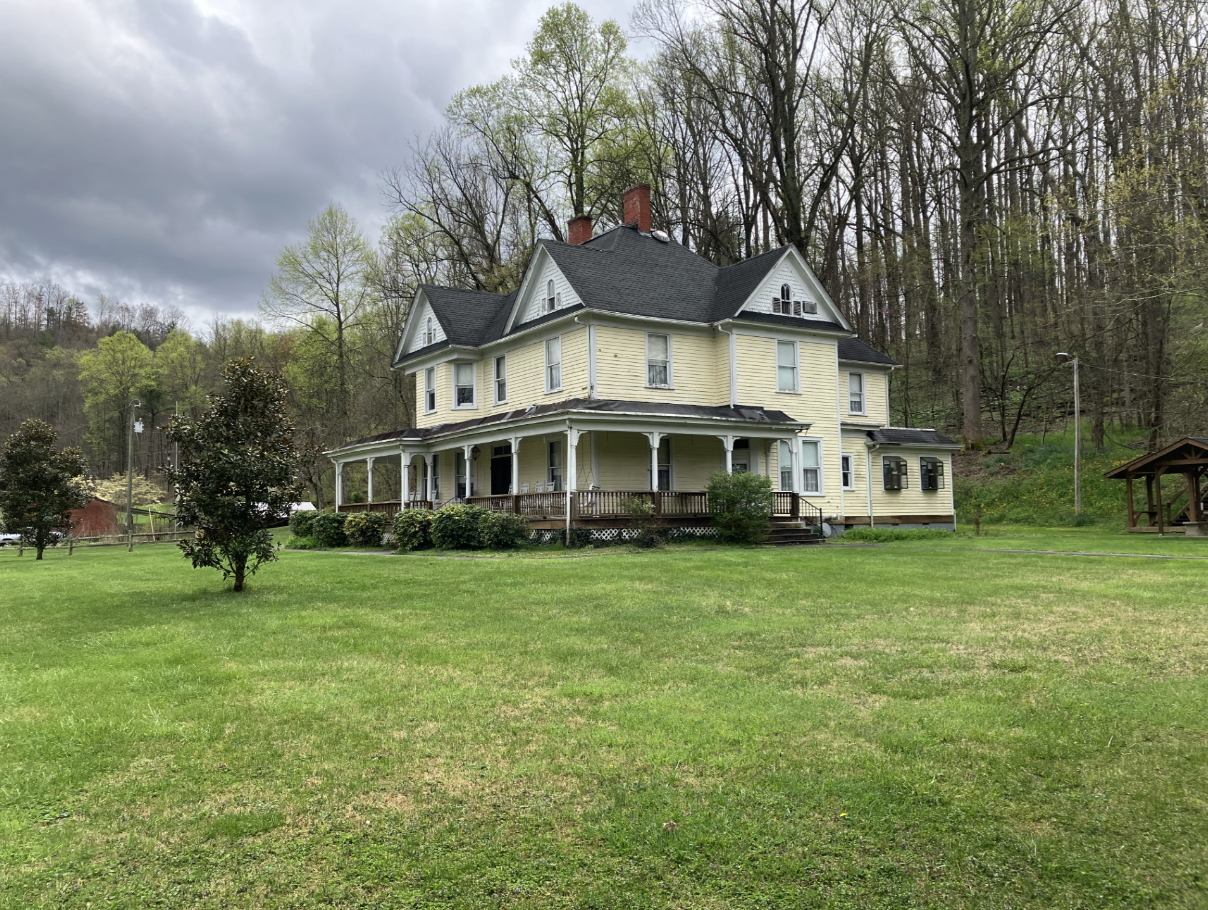
LEFT: The superintendent's house, known as the Morefield House, ca. 1903. RIGHT: The house has housed the Unicoi County Heritage Museum since 1982.

During the 1970s the hatchery sold most of its land on the western side of the railroad tracks to the town of Erwin, and that land became Fishery Park, a popular place for recreational fishing, swimming, and tennis. By 1982, the Morefield House was dilapidated and the U.S. Government ordered it demolished, but the Unicoi County Chamber of Commerce intervened and worked out an agreement with the hatchery's superintendent to preserve the house as a museum and community center. The Unicoi County Heritage Museum opened in the house on July 3, 1982.

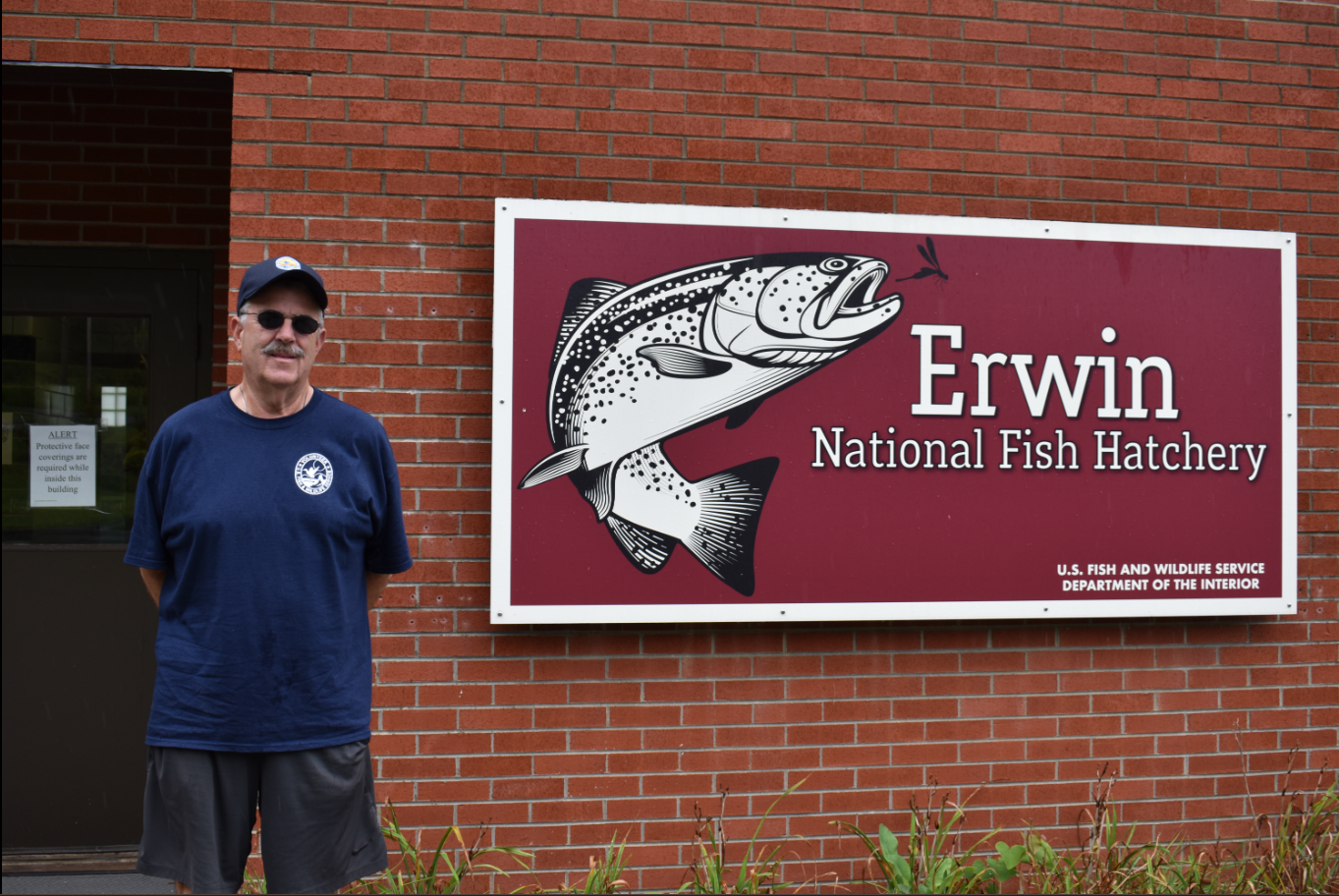
A volunteer at the hatchery.

In the early 1990s the hatchery covered the spring and put weatherport covers on all of the raceways to help reduce the risk of disease. More recently, the hatchery began programs to aid the recovery of endangered species in Appalachia. In the 21st century, the hatchery has sought to create more habitats on its property for bats and native pollinators and to construct a new building in which to breed non-game fish and freshwater mussels.

== Management ==
The USFWS operates the Erwin National Fish Hatchery, with both USFWS employees and volunteers taking part in hatchery activities. In both its routine fish production efforts and its efforts to support the recovery of threatened and endangered species, it partners with various agencies, organizations, and facilities, including the Tennessee Wildlife Resources Agency, the North Carolina Wildlife Resources Commission, the United States Forest Service, and the Tennessee Aquarium. For grounds restoration projects it works with the Appalachian Trail Conservancy, and for habitat enhancement it cooperates with the Boy Scouts of America. The hatchery operates the Unicoi County Heritage Museum in the Morefield House in cooperation with Unicoi County.

== Activities ==
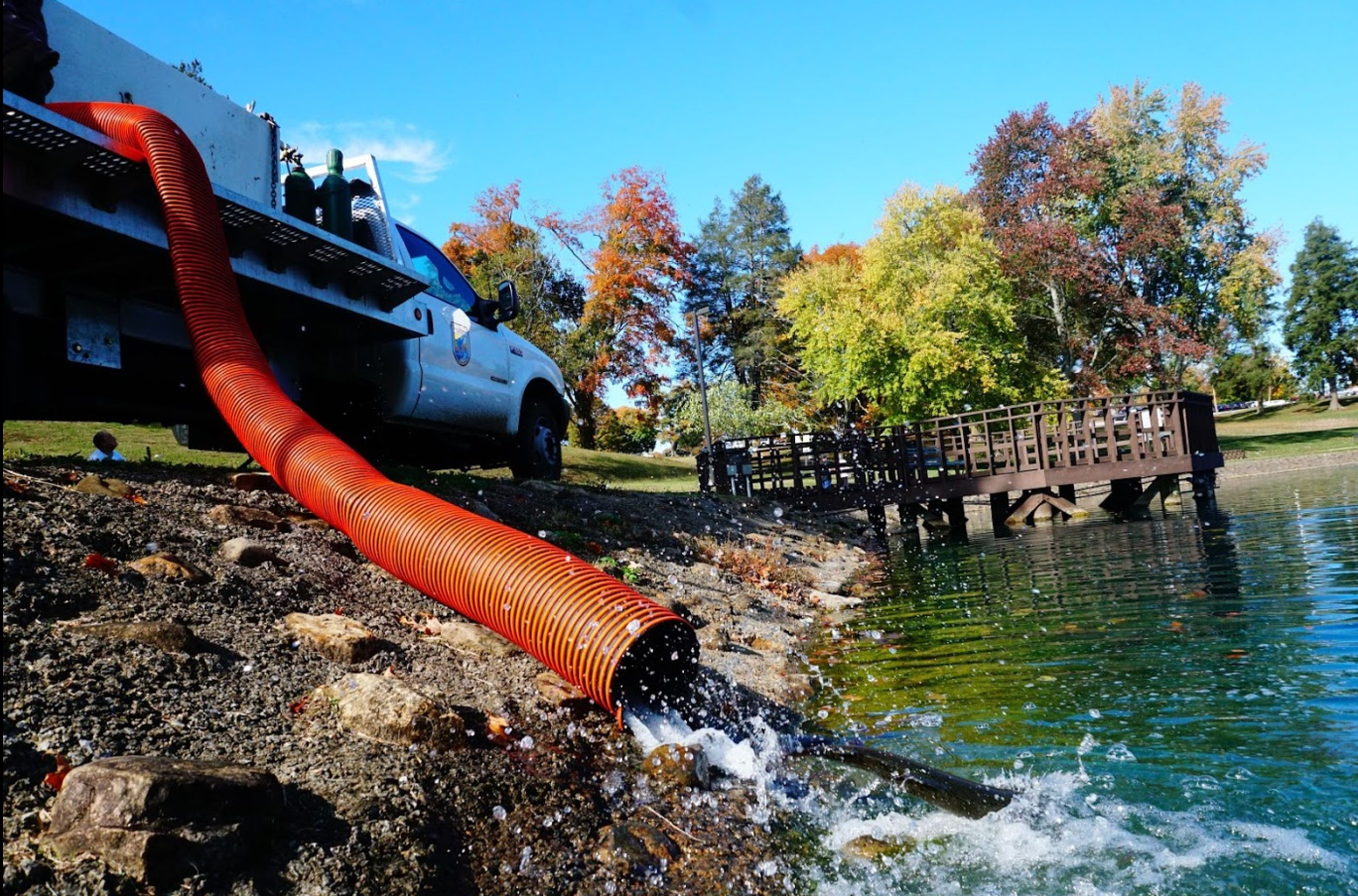
Stocking rainbow trout. The hatchery stocks waterways in the southeastern United States.

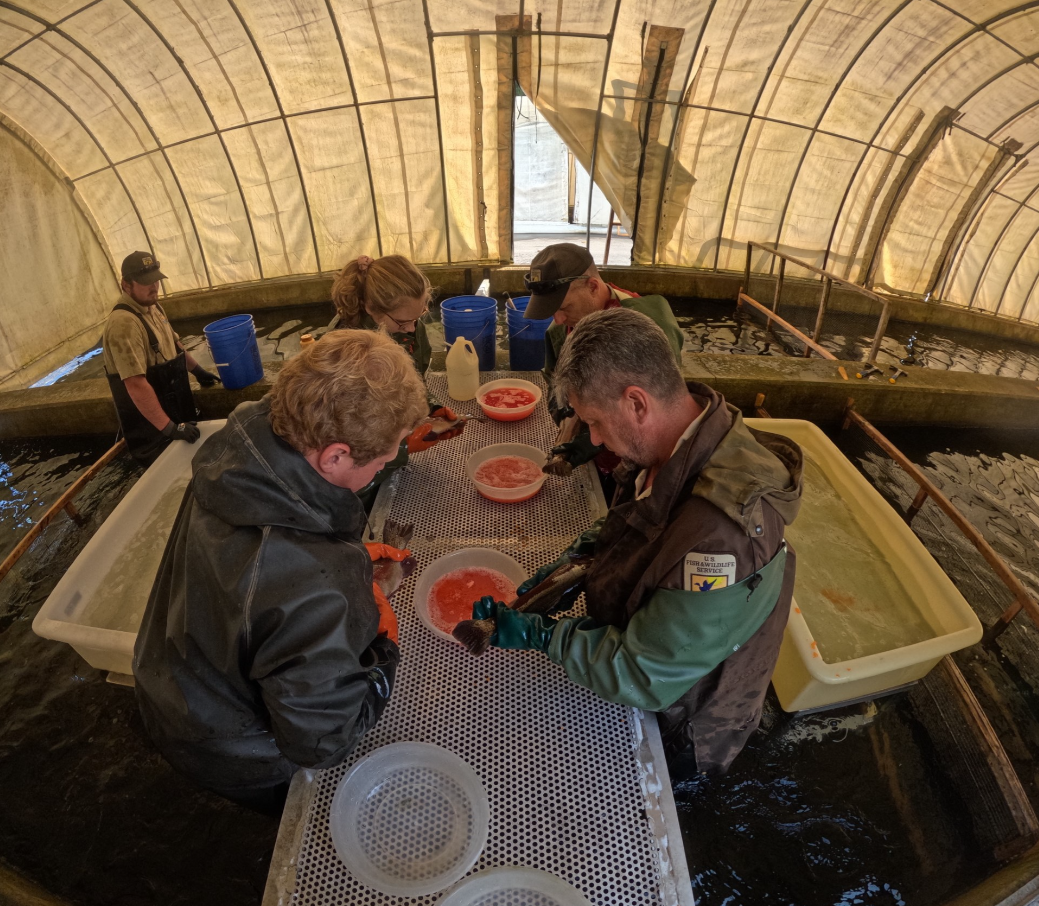
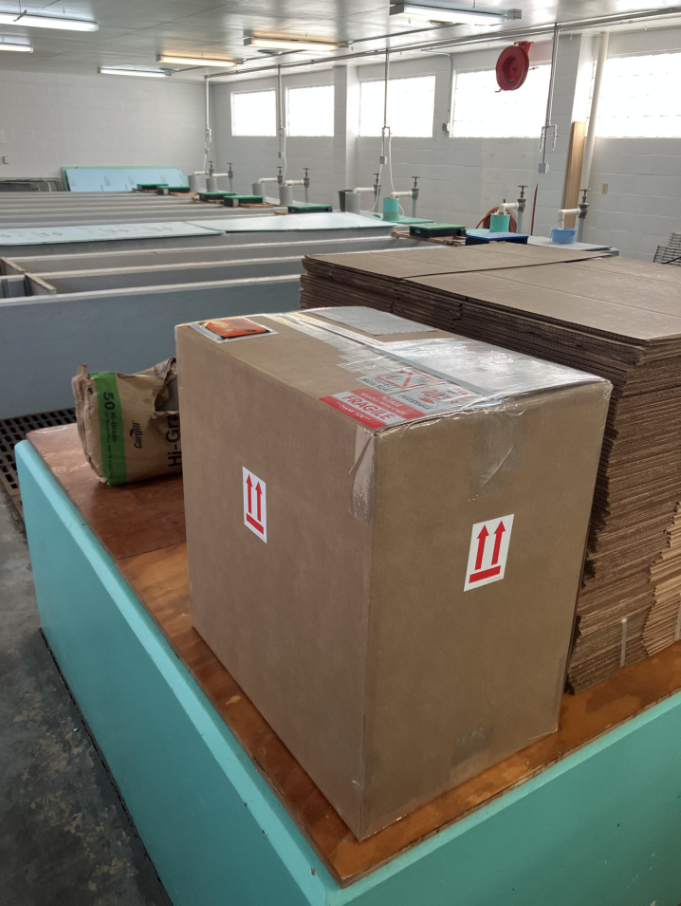
LEFT: Employees and volunteers squeeze eggs and milt from rainbow trout on July 28, 2023. RIGHT: Packed fish eggs ready for shipment on April 9, 2025.

The Erwin National Fish Hatchery specializes in the production of millions of rainbow trout and brook trout eggs each year as part of the National Broodstock Program. It maintains three different strains of rainbow trout and one strain of brook trout, each of which begins its spawning cycle at a different time of the year. The hatchery strives to optimize the genetic diversity of its broodstocks and conducts research into their behavior and performance to improve their quality. The eggs the hatchery produces supply a number of facilities in the eastern United States, and fish raised at the hatchery are used to stock waterways throughout the southeastern United States. The hatchery also provides eggs to research centers, universities, and schools for research and educational use.

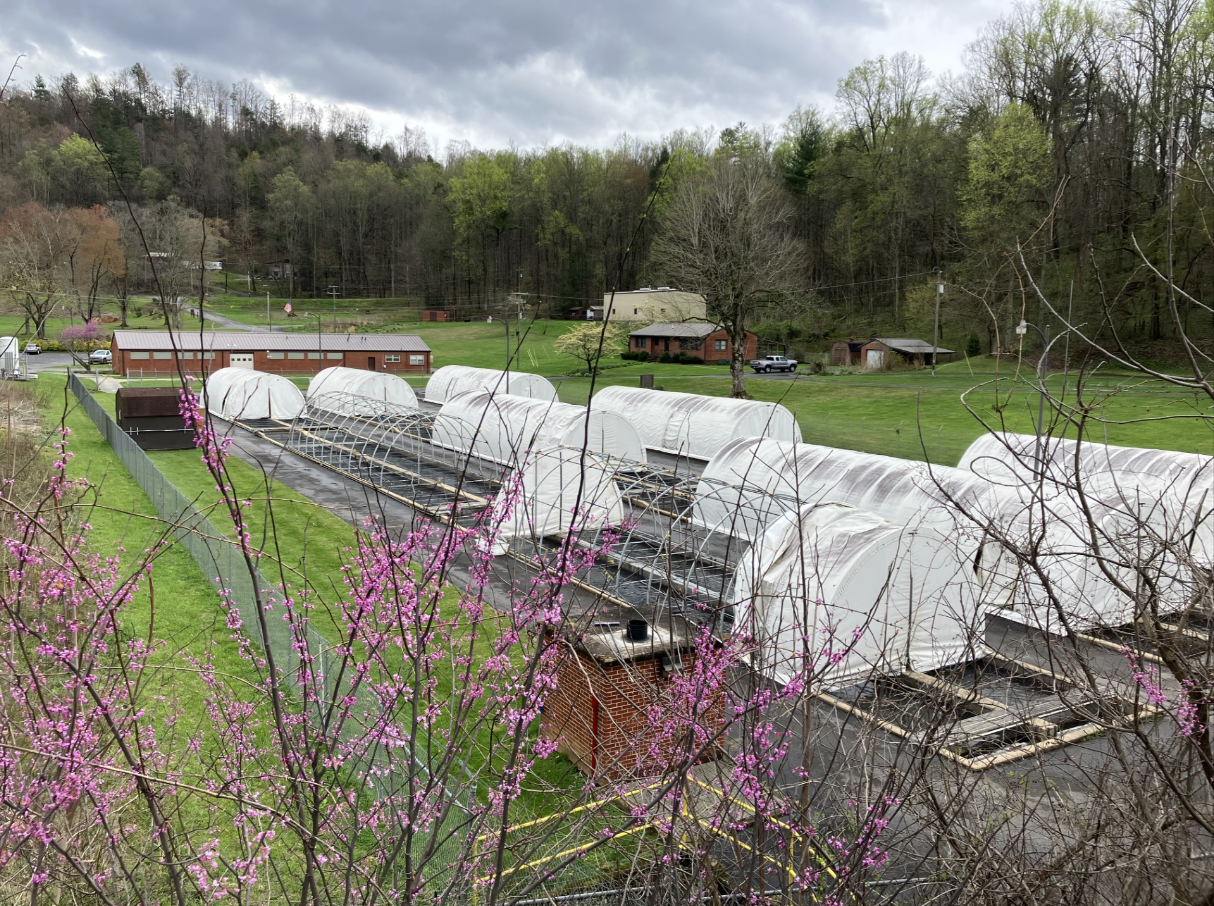
The hatchery building and its raceways on April 10, 2024.

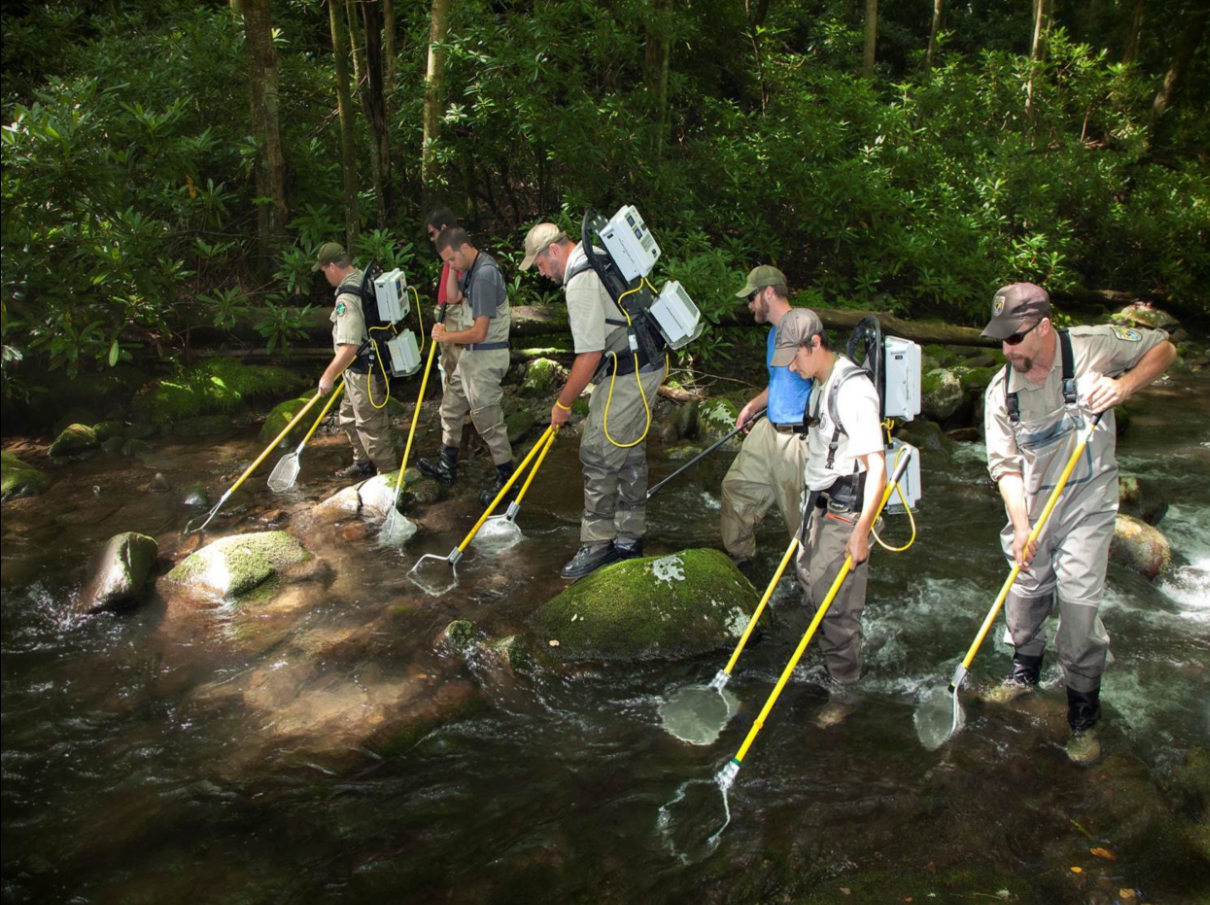
Hatchery staff and Tennessee Wildlife Resources Agency employees using electrofishing techniques to survey the fish population of a mountain stream.

The hatchery has begun to play a role in the long-term preservation and restoration of threatened and endangered species in the southeastern United States, partnering with other agencies and organizations to preserve and restore freshwater mussels, crayfish (infraorder Astacidea), lake sturgeon (Huso fulvescens), and the southern Appalachian brook trout, a strain of brook trout that is smaller than and genetically distinct from brook trout found farther north. The hatchery lists its "featured species" as the rainbow trout, the brook trout, and five mussels: the Alabama lamp mussel (Lampsilis virescens), Appalachian elktoe (Alasmidonta raveneliana), round hickorynut (Obovaria subrotunda), oyster mussel (Epioblasma capsaeformis), and Cumberlandian combshell (Epioblasma brevidens). The hatchery also is involved in work to preserve the snuffbox mussel (Epioblasma triquetra).

The hatchery takes part in annual stream surveys, working with research and conservation partners to capture, identify, and collect data on stream fish. Each year, it assists other agencies and organizations in measuring, weighing, and tagging lake sturgeon.

== Recreation ==
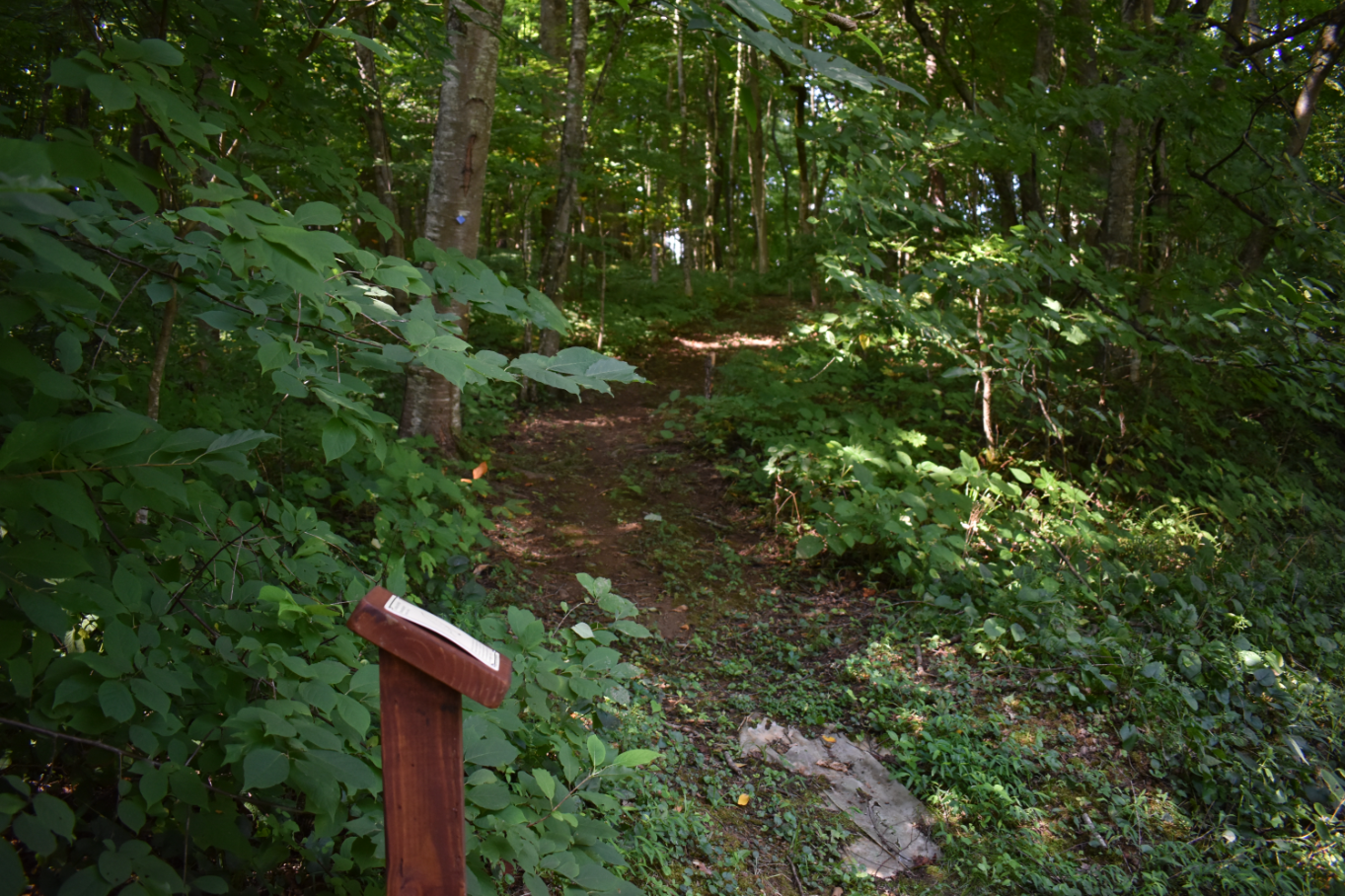
The hatchery's nature trail.

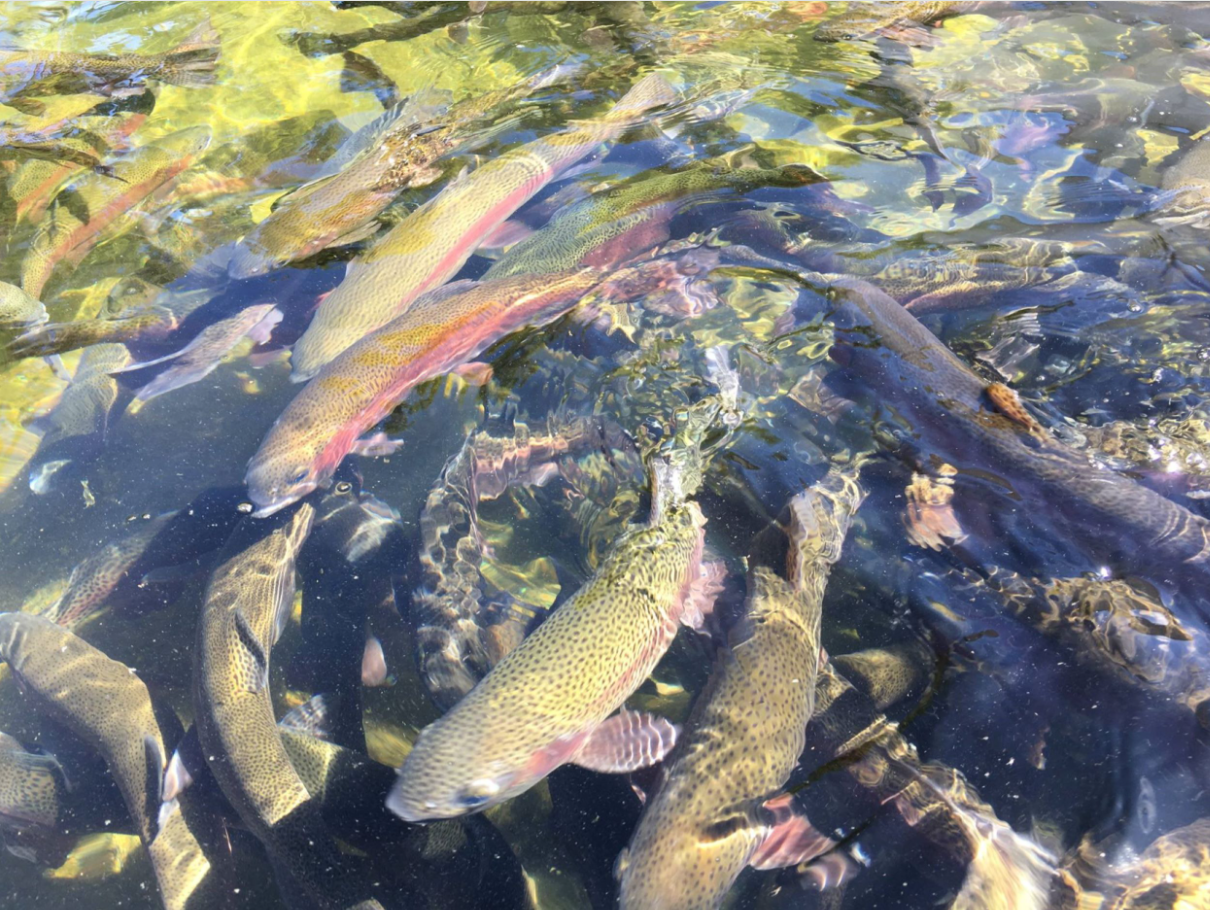
Adult rainbow trout (Oncorhynchus mykiss) on display at the hatchery.

The Erwin National Fish Hatchery provides various recreational opportunities for visitors. Its visitors center and raceways are open to the public for self-guided tours from 7:30 a.m. to 3:30 p.m. Monday through Friday and afford visitors an opportunity for a close-up view of the hatchery's fish production process, including spawning procedures, as well as to feed the fish in the raceways, although only with food provided by the hatchery's staff. The hatchery staff also schedules group tours for interested parties.

The Unicoi County Heritage Museum is on the grounds and has nine rooms open to the public, each themed to showcase an aspect of Unicoi County's history. The grounds have picnic tables and picnic shelters, and picnicking and dog-walking are permitted. The hatchery has a 0.5-mile (0.8 km) nature trail behind the Unicoi County Heritage Museum that is open to the public for hiking and marked with tree identification tags; the hike takes about 30 minutes. A wide variety of birds reside on or visit the hatchery property, and the grounds and nature trail offer opportunities for birdwatching, other wildlife observation, and wildlife photography. The public also may observe beehives and pollinator gardens on the hatchery grounds.

== See also ==
- National Fish Hatchery System
- List of National Fish Hatcheries in the United States
