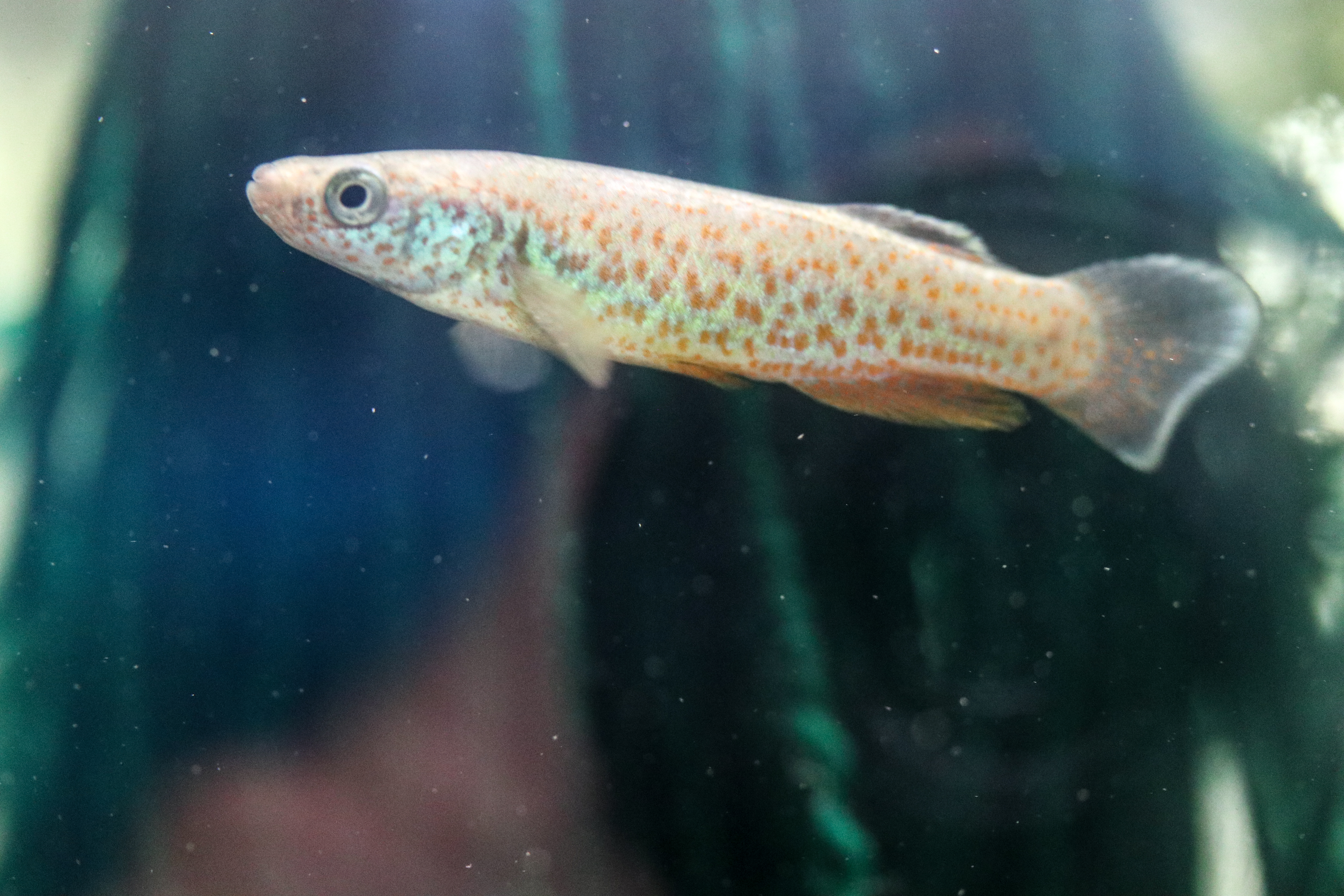
- Fundulus julisia

Conservation status
- Endangered (IUCN 3.1)

- Endangered (ESA)

Scientific classification
- Kingdom: Animalia
- Phylum: Chordata
- Class: Actinopterygii
- Order: Cyprinodontiformes
- Family: Fundulidae
- Genus: Fundulus
- Species: F. julisia

Binomial name
- Fundulus julisia J. D. Williams & Etnier, 1982

Synonyms
- Fundulus julisiae Williams & Etnier, 1982

= Barrens topminnow =

Species of fish

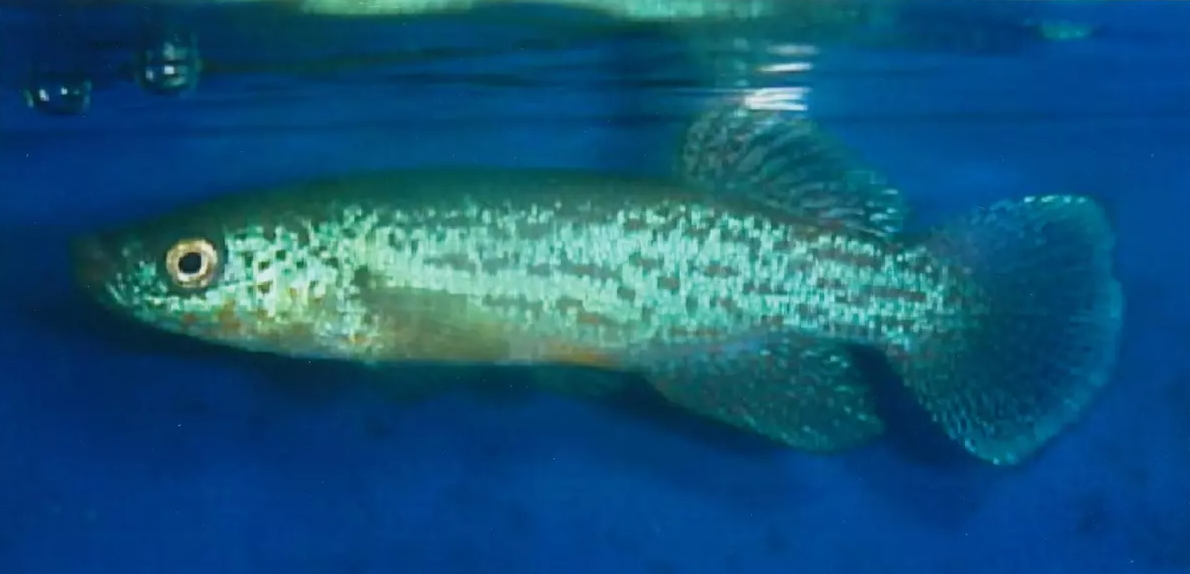
Fundulus julisia.

The Barrens topminnow (Fundulus julisia) is an endangered species of freshwater fish in the family Fundulidae.

== Geographic distribution ==
F. julisia is not only found in one state, Tennessee, but also in only one region, the Barrens Plateau, a region of Middle Tennessee west of the Cumberland Plateau. In that specific region it is currently only found in the Elk River and a drainage creek of the Cumberland River, West Hickory Creek. However, that has not always been the only thought of location for F. julisia's habitat. They are often associated with springs, but drought conditions made them adapt to survive in springs where permanent water was near by. They prefer heavily vegetated areas of aquatic vegetation or algae in shallow, slow moving water. Given the above habitat, it is observed that F. julisia can tolerate warm temperatures of water and turbidity, the presence of competitors, and the presence of predators. This, along with spawning, make aquatic vegetation a limiting factor for the fish.

Historically, F. julisia was also found in the Duck River. The population there is thought to have been extirpated by the 1960s.

== Ecology ==
In overall behavior F. julisia does not differ greatly from other members of the genus Fundulus. It is an opportunistic carnivore that preys upon crustaceans, gastropods (snails and slugs), and insects that are both aquatic and that fall into the substrate. In an examination of gut contents it was found that crustaceans made up 64% of their diet while aquatic insects made up 23% and various other organisms made up the remaining 13%. It competes for this prey with F. catenatus (northern studfish) and Gambusia affinis (western mosquitofish). This is an interesting relationship because G. affinis is one of the leading causes of decline in F. julisia due to competition for the same prey. F. julisia is preyed upon by bass (Micropterus species) and sunfish (Lepomis species) within the substrate. Outside the water F. julisia is preyed upon by piscivorous birds that spear them with a sharp tipped beak or catch them with ridged edged beaks. During breeding season males are easily spotted due to their bright mating colors, which makes them easier prey. Males have been found to have two different morphs with the primary difference being the marginal and submarginal bands on the caudal and posterior dorsal fin. One morph has a pale yellow submarginal band and the other translucent blue with white and orange submarginal bands. All females are far less colorful, appearing yellowish and washed out. Even as juveniles males and females can be distinguished from one another due to the males having iridescent green coloration on their sides.

== Life history ==
Breeding season for this species is annual and is believed to be as early as mid-March when the males were observed to first have their breeding colors. At this time the water temperature is roughly 14–15 °C (57–59 °F). Eggs have been collected in mid-April from clumps of algae. Females lay around 200 to 250 mature ova over a period of time, laying only a few daily. Though relatively opportunistic in spawning sites, F. julisia egg morphology suggests that submergent vegetation is most preferred and in turn most successful. Loss of successful spawning sites could be one of the main ecological factors that limit its distribution. Territoriality has been observed in the field, but it is more abundant in aquaria settings. In aquaria males have been observed defending portions of the tank that resulted in a single male's dominance. In the field males only slightly defend their clumps of filamentous algae. Females never exhibited territorial behavior in the field, but were seen defending feeding areas in the aquaria. Sexual maturity is reached at 1 year with a maximum lifespan of three years, though most individuals do not live that long and die off after spawning.

== Current management ==
The Nature Conservancy of Tennessee (TNC) is working with private landowners to preserve local habitats known to support F. julisia. The Tennessee Wildlife Resources Agency (TWRA) is also participating in these activities and upgraded the state status of the species to endangered. The U.S. Fish and Wildlife Service (USFWS) and the Natural Resources Conservation Service (NRCS) are also actively funding and assisting landowners to protect habitat, both where the fish currently occurs, as well as at sites where populations are currently being or may be restored in the near future. Through the aid of these organizations captive breeding programs have been successful and reintroduction of F. julisia to areas of the Barrens Plateau is being implemented.

The Barrens topminnow was declared an endangered species by USWFS and began receiving protection under the Endangered Species Act of 1973 in 2019.

== Management recommendations ==
In relation to current management plans it is important to continue monitoring the introduced populations for success, failure, and any other occurrence such as over predation and lack of viable habitat. Land management should also be incorporated into F. julisia's management. The success of the stream is directly related to the success of the land. Buffer zones need to be put in to protect the stream habitats from runoff and siltation. These zones need to be at least 20–35 feet wide extending outward from the stream to add stability to the tree species and prevent blow down into water. Canopy cover from trees will moderate temperature and create woody debris in the substrate that will create micro-habitats that support prey species of F. julisia. This will also deter access to the stream, thus maintaining its health. Open water habitats that are shallow and slow moving need to be created along with the addition and growth of filamentous algae for success in spawning. To ensure the population is stabilized, periodic sampling is highly recommended. Sampling should occur at least every 6 months to monitor breeding and survival success rates. Electroshockers would be the most accurate way to find a population size. It allows you to catch a larger batch of fish and gives you time to examine and take measurements while the fish is stunned. Shocking should take place in the pool portions of the streams leading up to the riffle area since F. julisia is known to attempt to escape from predators in that portion of the stream. Invasive species should be monitored and removed if they become a threat to the livelihood of F. julisia. This should also be done via electroshocking. With these management practices in place F. julisia populations should be able to be maintained and even increased over time.

There are many potential causes of decline of this species including the invasive western mosquitofish (Gambusia affinis) that will replace native species on a population level, wading piscivorous birds that prey on adults, and the overall restricted distribution of the species. Managing for this species is vital for its success, but to do so there must be an understanding of the species' characteristics. It is endemic to a small portion of Tennessee in the Elk River and West Hickory Creek in the Cumberland River drainage. The life span of F. julisia is very short, living up to only three years. In many cases the majority of the population does not even reach that age. Most adult males are eaten by birds because of their bright coloration during breeding season. Current management plans are in place for the improvement of the species such as captive breeding and reintroduction, and also private management of streams and land. Yet, more can be done to aid them in their survival efforts. Buffer zones around streams can be created to promote the health of the stream and close observation of the introduced populations needs to be a priority. With only three small original populations left in the wild it is important that species survive in captivity, but more so in its natural environment.

== See also ==
- Dale Hollow National Fish Hatchery
