= Natchitoches National Fish Hatchery =

Fish hatchery in Natchitoches, Louisiana

Coordinates: 31.73838°N 93.07892°W

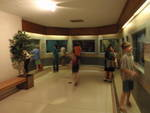
A viewing area.

The Natchitoches National Fish Hatchery is a federal, warm water fish hatchery located in Natchitoches, Louisiana, United States. Natchitoches is involved in spawning, hatching and rearing young fish.

== Facilities ==
Natchitoches National Fish Hatchery is along the Cane River and has 53 ponds, each approximately 0.8 acres (3,200 m^{2}) in area. In addition, the facility has the Harold B. Wales Environmental Education Classroom, which is used for kindergarten through twelfth grade and for teacher workshops. The classroom seats 32 students and has 16 student grade dissecting microscopes.

== The fish ==
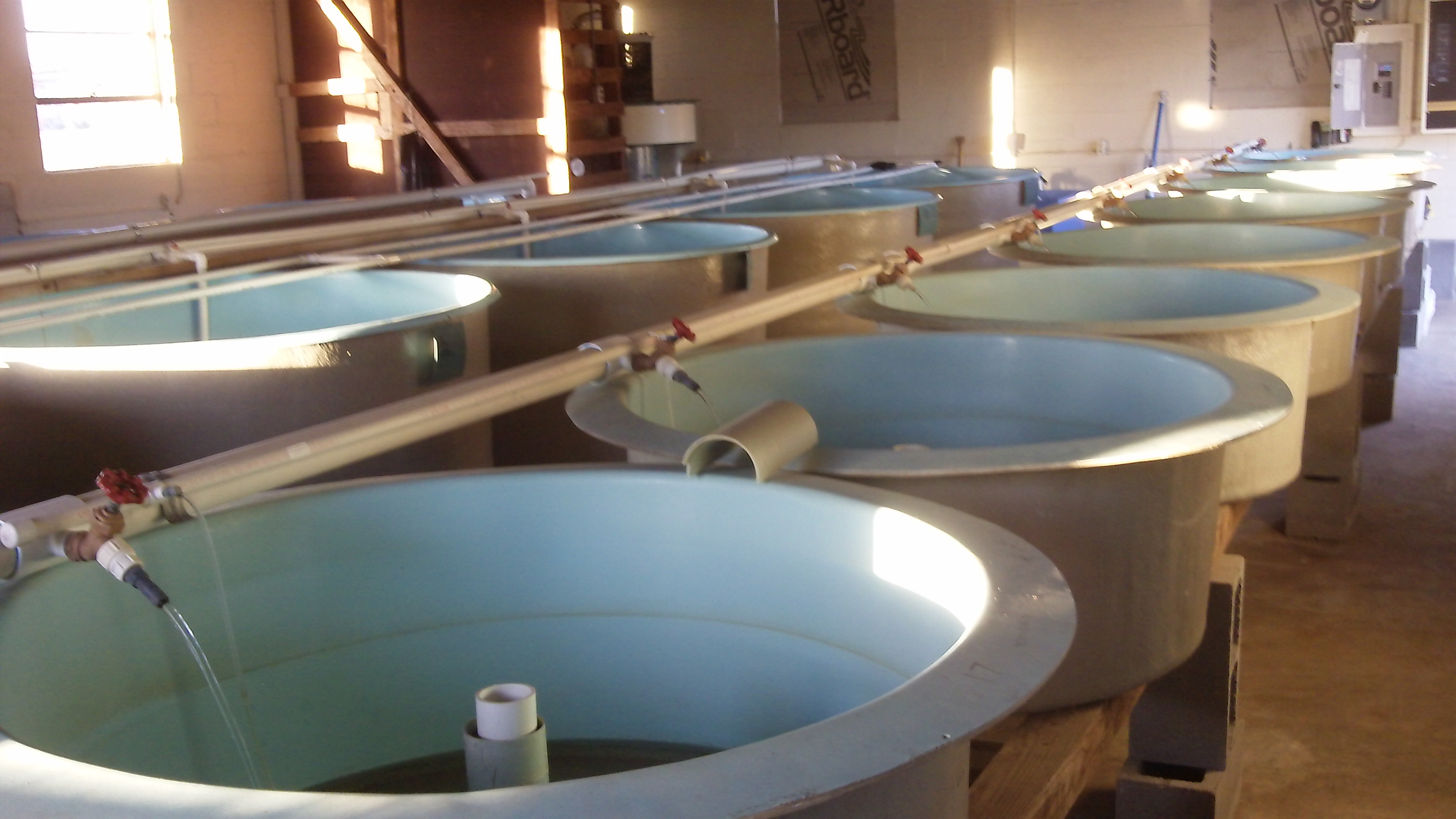
Tanks for the alligator snapping turtle hatchlings.

Natchitoches handles six species of fish, in addition to the Alligator snapping turtle and the Louisiana pearlshell mussel.

=== Paddlefish ===
The paddlefish (Polyodon spathula) is the only remaining member of the family Polyodontidae. Paddlefish are spawned and raised at Natchitoches until they are approximately six to ten inches (150 to 250 mm) in length, before they are released into the wild.

=== Striped bass ===
Striped bass (Morone saxatilis) are members of the sea bass family. Natchitoches National Fish Hatchery is working to restore the historical range and population levels of these fish.

=== Pallid sturgeon ===
The Pallid sturgeon (Scaphirhynchus albus) is a member of the sturgeon family. The hatchery is working to develop spawning and culture techniques to raise a large number of Pallid sturgeon. Workers at the hatchery hope to raise enough of these fish to take the species off of the Endangered Species List.

=== Channel catfish ===
The Channel catfish (Ictalurus punctatus) is a member of the family Ictaluridae. Natchitoches works to raise many of these fish for release into the wild.

=== Largemouth bass ===
The Largemouth bass (Micropterus salmoides) is the most desired of all freshwater game. Because of this, these bass require the attention of resource management agencies. Natchitoches National Fish Hatchery raises over 1 million largemouth bass every year.

=== Bluegill ===
The Bluegill (Lepomis macrochirus) is a fish that is quite easy to catch. The hatchery raises many of these fish every year.
