= Raceway (aquaculture) =

Artificial channel used in aquaculture

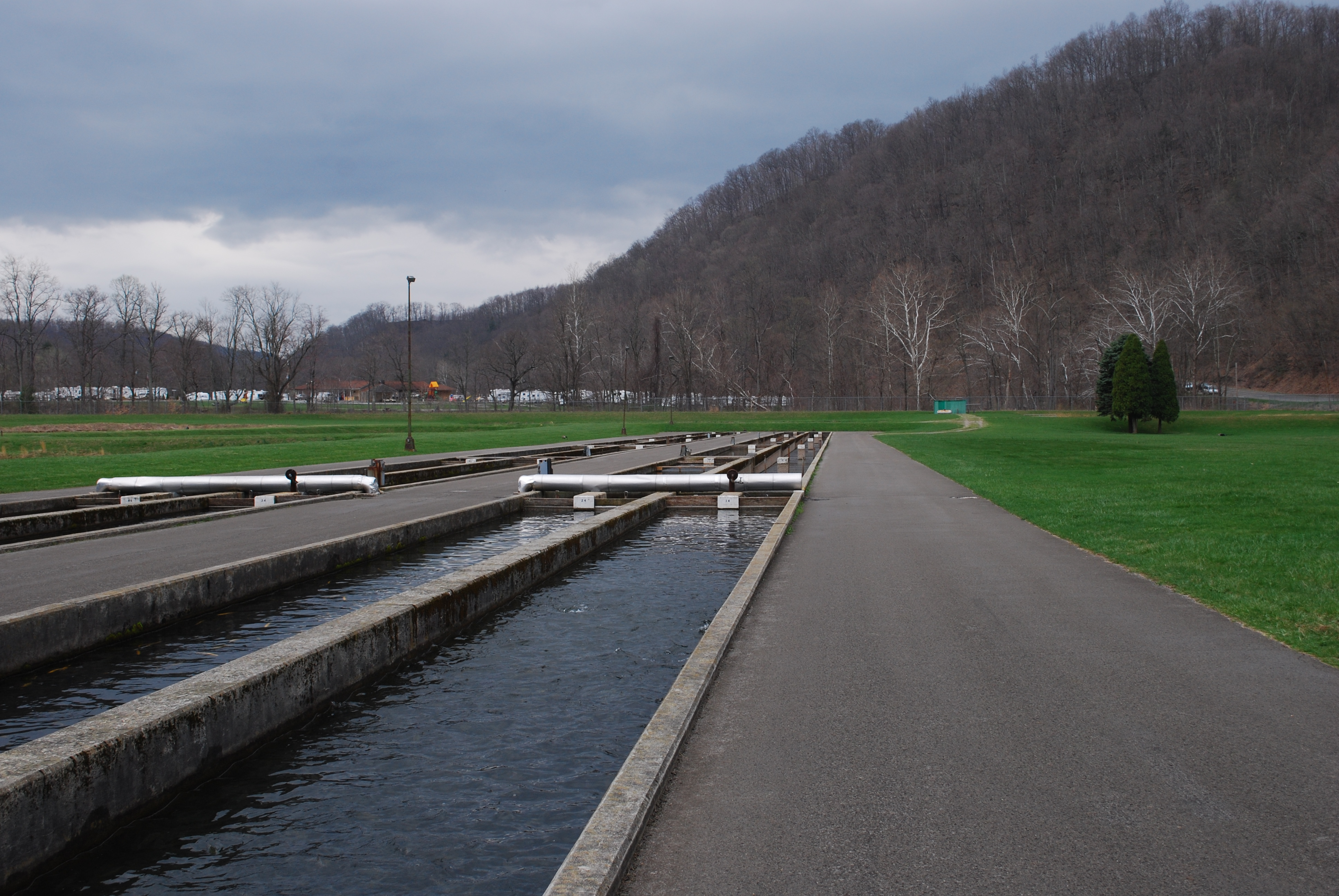
Raceways at a West Virginia fish hatchery

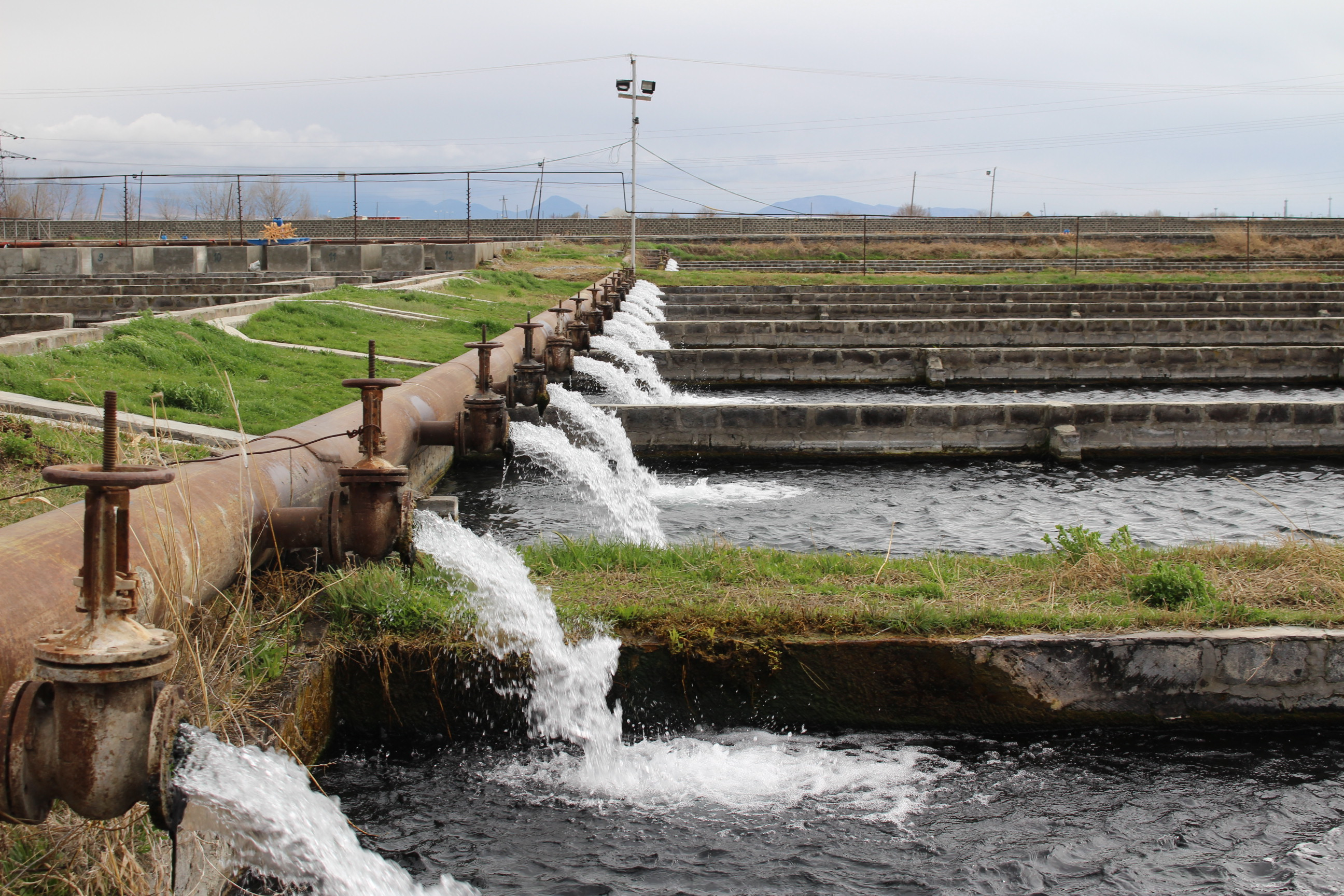
Flow-through raceway system in Masis, Armenia

A raceway, also known as a flow-through system, is an artificial channel used in aquaculture to culture aquatic organisms. Raceway systems are among the earliest methods used for inland aquaculture. A raceway usually consists of rectangular basins or canals constructed of concrete and equipped with an inlet and outlet. A continuous water flow-through is maintained to provide the required level of water quality, which allows animals to be cultured at higher densities within the raceway.

Freshwater species such as trout, catfish and tilapia are commonly cultured in raceways. Raceways are also used for some marine species which need a constant water flow, such as juvenile salmon, brackish water sea bass and sea bream and marine invertebrates such as abalone.

== Site selection ==
The most important factor to consider when selecting a site for a raceway farm is the water supply. Water sources for raceway aquaculture operations are usually streams, springs, reservoirs or deep wells. Trout do best in spring water because it keeps a constant temperature, while catfish need a strong flow, about 80 litres (21.1 US gallons; 17.6 imperial gallons) per second for every 0.4 hectares (1 acre) of raceway. A backup water supply should be positioned so, if the water supply or pump fails, it can flow by gravity into the start of the raceway.

== Construction ==
Most raceways are made of reinforced concrete, though some earthen raceways are also built. Earthen raceways with plastic liners cost little and are easy to build, but cleaning and disinfecting them is difficult and plastic linings are fragile. Reinforced concrete is more expensive, but is durable and can be shaped in complex ways. Raceway tanks can also be built from polyester resin. These tanks have smooth walls, and are mobile and easy to service. However, their cost limits them to small sizes, under 5 cubic metres (177 cubic feet).

== Size ==
A raceway is most often a rectangular canal with a water current flowing from a supply end to an exit end. The length to width ratio is important in raceways. To prevent the fish stock from swimming in circular movements, which would cause debris to build up in the centre, a length to width ratio of at least six to one is recommended. If the width is too large this could result in a feeble current speed which is not desirable (see below). The length of a raceway unit is usually constrained by the water quality or by how much stock a unit can hold for ease of management. The average depth of a raceway for fin fish, such as rainbow trout, is about one metre (3 ft 3 in). This means each section in a raceway should be about 30 metres (98 feet) long and 2.5 to 3 metres (8 feet 2 inches to 9 feet 10 inches) wide. The landscape should sloped to one or two percent, so the flow through the system can be maintained by gravity. The raceway should not be curved, so the flow will be uniform.

A raceway farm for freshwater fin fish usually has a dozen or more parallel raceway strips build alongside each other, with each strip consisting of 15 to 20 or more serial sections. The risk of unhygienic conditions increases towards the lower level sections, and can be kept in check by ensuring there are not too many sections and the water flow is adequate. In order to isolate any diseased section and avoid transmitting the disease back to the upper raceways, each section should have its own drainage channel. Controls, such as weirs, are also needed to ensure individual raceways can't accidentally overflow or empty.

== Water flow ==
The water flow rate in a raceway system needs to be sufficiently high to meet the respiratory (dissolved oxygen) requirements for the species concerned and to flush out metabolic wastes, especially ammonia. In a well designed system, the existing water in the raceway is largely replaced by new water when the same volume of new water enters the raceway. Self-cleaning can sometimes be achieved if the fish stocks density is sufficiently high and the water level is sufficiently low. For example, if trout are stocked at 20 kilograms per cubic metre (1.25 pounds per cubic foot), they can keep the raceway unit clean by their swimming movements, preventing waste solids from settling to the raceway floor.

However, in most cases it is necessary to frequently clean raceways. The simplest way is to lower the water level in the raceway units, which increases the speed of the water current, and then herd the fish together till they flush the waste from the raceway. Solid wastes which accumulate at the raceway bottom can be removed by pumps. Oxygen levels in the water can be kept high if the raceway units are placed one after the other with intermediate drops over weirs, or by the use of aeration systems such as pumps, blowers and agitators.

Generally the water should be replaced about every hour. This means a typical raceway section requires a flow rate around 30 litres (7.9 US gallons; 6.6 imperial gallons) per second. However, the optimum flow through rate depends on the species, because there are differences in the rates at which oxygen is consumed and metabolic wastes are produced. For example, trout and juvenile salmon are less tolerant of degraded water quality and require a more rapid water turnover than catfish or tilapia. The flow rate necessary to maintain water quality can also change through the year, as the temperature changes and the cultured species grow larger. For reason such as these, continuous monitoring of water quality is important, including measurements of water flow rates, pH levels and temperature, as well as the levels of dissolved oxygen, and suspended and solid waste material.

== Maximum load ==
The maximum load of organisms that can be cultured in a raceway system depends on the species, and particularly on the size of the species. For trout, stocking rates of 30 to 50 kg/m^{3} (1.9 to 3.1 lb/cu ft) are normal at the end of a rearing cycle, while for marine species, such as sea bass and sea bream, the achievable load is lower, between 15 and 20 kg/m^{3} (0.9 to 1.25 lb/cu ft). The total volume required for a raceway is calculated by dividing the total amount of fish in kilgrams by the desired stocking rate in kilograms per cubic metre.

== Feed ==
In most raceway aquaculture food needs to be supplied. The composition of the food, and the amount and time of feeding needs to be adjusted to the specific species. This can be optimised to reduce costs and minimize the amount of waste.

== Waste water ==
The treatment of waste water issuing from raceway farms is a major concern. Fish fecal matter and uneaten feed are typically the major elements of solid waste produced in raceway aquaculture farms. These can adversely impact the environment in the receiving water body. Of particular environmental concern is the waste product phosphorus. Excessive discharge of phosphorus to receiving waters can result in eutrophication. For example, in Korea poor waste treatments in trout farms resulted in reservoirs and rivers developing red tides, which caused wider social problems.

Because raceway aquaculture operations discharge large volumes of water, the concentration of discharged solids is low. This means it is not easy to treat and implement practical, cost effective treatments. Technologies for the removal of solids include microscreens, dual-drain tanks, swirl separators, plate separators, baffles, media filters, air flotation, foam fractionation, chemical flocculation, and constructed wetlands. But because of the impracticality and / or high costs of these methods, most of them are not applicable for commercial aquaculture. As a consequence, sedimentation (settling) is still the most widely applied and cost effective technology. Since 1999, regulations in South Korea require that all raceway farms provide waste water treatment facilities covering at least 20% of the farmed area to prevent pollution of the freshwater environment. Open raceway ponds were used for removal of heavy metal ions like lead using live Spirulina (Arthospira) sp.

== In shrimp farming ==
In 2012 Dr. Addison Lawrence received a patent for his System and Method for Super-Intensive Shrimp Production. This system employs artificial raceways to produce large quantities of shrimp. In an interview with Undercurrent News Lawrence said, “We have several very interested commercial groups interested in using the technology to develop shrimp farms in the United States, and we have several groups interested in developing farms outside of the US," Super-Intensive Shrimp Production offers the capability to have no outflow, saving on water costs, reducing the impact on local water resources and reducing the environmental impact of shrimp farming.

== See also ==
- Fish hatchery
- Fish ladder
- Raceway pond
