= Mary V. Riley =

Apache politician (1908–1987)

- 1962 groundbreaking ceremony for FATCO sawmill
- Born: Mary Velasquez; December 24, 1908; Fort Apache, Arizona
- Died: October 5, 1987 (aged 78); Whiteriver, Arizona
- Other name: Mary Velasquez Riley
- Citizenship: White Mountain Apache Tribe of the Fort Apache Reservation, United States
- Occupations: farmer, tribal council member
- Years active: 1958–1978
- Known for: first woman elected to serve on the White Mountain Apache Tribal Council

Mary V. Riley (December 24, 1908 – October 5, 1987) was an Apache tribal council member who was instrumental in the economic development of the White Mountain Apache Tribe. She was the first woman to be elected to serve on the tribal council and worked toward bringing timber and tourism industries to the reservation to ensure their economic stability. She was inducted into the Arizona Women's Hall of Fame posthumously in 1988.

== Early life ==
Mary Velasquez was born on December 24, 1908 (Note: The 1916 Indian Census gives her birth date as December 20, 1908. (Note, this family reference on various census reports is R-24).) at Fort Apache, on the White Mountain Apache Reservation to Nalatzalay (Belle née Ivins) and Jesus Velasquez. Her father was born in Fort Davis, Texas to Mexican nationals from Coahuila, Martín and Juana (née Rivers) Velasquez, and came to Fort Apache traveling with soldiers from Ft. Davis, as a child with his mother. He worked for a time as a translator and scout and then managed a ranch where he provided supplies to the soldiers at the fort. Her mother was a full-blood Apache and the daughter of Nadischaay. Velasquez and her siblings grew up on their father's farm, helping with farm chores. She attended three years of school, but was forced to leave in the 1918 flu pandemic to help with sick relatives.

Though she was unable to return to school, Velasquez became fluent in three languages: Apache, Spanish, and English. She read newspapers widely. Velasquez first married Kurt Johnson and then around 1936, married Peter Kessay Riley, with whom she raised her five children, all of whom were also trilingual, and to whom she stressed the importance of gaining an education. She farmed as her father had, raising corn, potatoes, pumpkin and squash, as well as turkey, goat and sheep.

== Tribal career ==
In 1958, Riley became the first woman elected to serve on the White Mountain Apache Tribal Council. She served on the health, education and welfare committee of the tribe and at various times, chaired the committee. She made numerous trips to both the state capital, Phoenix and federal capital in Washington, D. C., lobbying on behalf of the tribe. In an effort to improve situations for tribal members, she evaluated many programs for both economic and socio-cultural gains, looking at federal programs such as Job Corps the Boy Scouts of America, and Bureau of Indian Affairs loan programs for economic development. Riley represented three districts of the reservation and was instrumental in projects, such as the Alchesay-Williams Creek National Fish Hatchery Complex, the Fort Apache Timber Company (FATCO), and the Sunrise Park Ski Resort and Hotel, among others, to expand the tribal enterprises and provide economic stability for the tribe.

Ground was broken for FATCO in 1962 and by 1963 had replaced the hiring of outside operators to manage the timber reserves of the tribe. By managing their own lumber harvests and operating three saw mills, the tribe was able to provide both jobs for tribal members and goods to sell to a wider clientele. In 1972, the Alchesay-Williams Fish Hatchery Complex — consisting of the Alchesay National Fish Hatchery and the Williams Creek National Fish Hatchery — was established to stock the local lakes which had been created on the reservation and protect species listed as threatened or endangered. Employment opportunities for tribal members were increased through jobs at the hatcheries, related jobs in the tourism sector, and additional revenues were garnered through the sale of fishing licenses. One of the largest projects was to convert 1.6 million acres of their lands into the Sunrise Park Resort. Constructing 20 recreational lakes, campsites, fishing and hunting venues, a ski resort, and hotels, the Tribal Council utilized their lands to generate a year-round tourist industry.

Riley was interviewed as part of an Oral History Project sponsored by the Arizona State Department of Libraries and Archives in 1977. After twenty years on the council, Riley retired in 1978. She was honored by the state in 1984 during the Statehood Day Celebrations for her leadership and development. Profits from FATCO were used to build the Mary V. Riley Building, which houses the tribal educational department.

== Death and legacy ==
Riley died on October 5, 1987, at White Mountain River Indian Hospital in Whiteriver, Arizona. Posthumously, she was inducted into the Arizona Women's Hall of Fame, in 1988.

== See also ==
- List of Native American politicians
- Native American women in politics
