= List of national fish hatcheries in the United States =

This list of National Fish Hatcheries in the United States includes 71 National Fish Hatcheries, two National Fish Hatchery Complexes, seven Fish Technology Centers, and nine Fish Health Centers administered as components of the National Fish Hatchery System by the United States Fish and Wildlife Service.

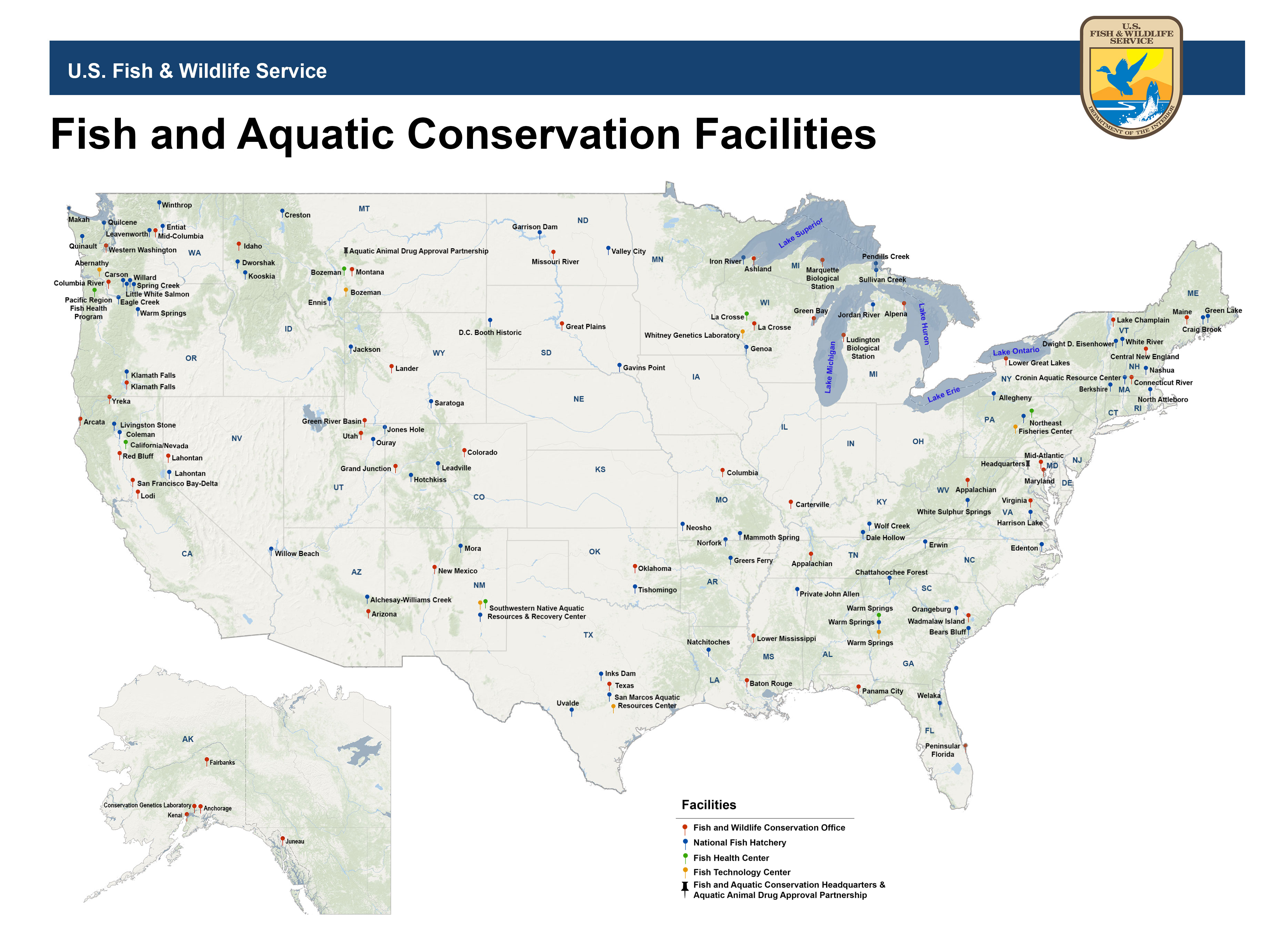
Map of the National Fish Hatcheries

Hatchery name	Location
Alchesay National Fish Hatchery (part of the Alchesay-Williams Creek; National Fish Hatchery Complex)	Arizona
Allegheny National Fish Hatchery	Pennsylvania
Bears Bluff National Fish Hatchery	South Carolina
Berkshire National Fish Hatchery	Massachusetts
Bozeman National Fish Hatchery	Montana
Carson National Fish Hatchery (part of the Columbia River Gorge; National Fish Hatchery Complex)	Washington
Chattahoochee Forest National Fish Hatchery	Georgia
Coleman National Fish Hatchery	California
Craig Brook National Fish Hatchery	Maine
Creston National Fish Hatchery	Montana
D.C. Booth Historic National Fish Hatchery	South Dakota
Dale Hollow National Fish Hatchery	Tennessee
Dwight D. Eisenhower National Fish Hatchery (ex-Pittsford National Fish Hatchery)	Vermont
Dworshak National Fish Hatchery	Idaho
Eagle Creek National Fish Hatchery (part of the Columbia River Gorge; National Fish Hatchery Complex)	Oregon
Edenton National Fish Hatchery	North Carolina
Ennis National Fish Hatchery	Montana
Entiat National Fish Hatchery	Washington
Erwin National Fish Hatchery	Tennessee
Garrison Dam National Fish Hatchery	North Dakota
Gavins Point National Fish Hatchery	South Dakota
Genoa National Fish Hatchery	Wisconsin
Green Lake National Fish Hatchery	Maine
Greers Ferry National Fish Hatchery	Arkansas
Harrison Lake National Fish Hatchery	Virginia
Hotchkiss National Fish Hatchery	Colorado
Inks Dam National Fish Hatchery	Texas
Iron River National Fish Hatchery	Wisconsin
Jackson National Fish Hatchery	Wyoming
Jones Hole National Fish Hatchery	Utah
Jordan River National Fish Hatchery	Michigan
Kooskia National Fish Hatchery	Idaho
Lahontan National Fish Hatchery	Nevada
Lamar National Fish Hatchery	Pennsylvania
Leadville National Fish Hatchery	Colorado
Leavenworth National Fish Hatchery	Washington
Little White Salmon National Fish Hatchery (part of the Columbia River Gorge; National Fish Hatchery Complex)	Washington
Livingston Stone National Fish Hatchery	California
Makah National Fish Hatchery (part of the Puget Sound/Olympic; Peninsula Fisheries Complex)	Washington
Mammoth Spring National Fish Hatchery	Arkansas
Mora National Fish Hatchery and Technology Center	New Mexico
Nashua National Fish Hatchery	New Hampshire
Natchitoches National Fish Hatchery	Louisiana
Neosho National Fish Hatchery	Missouri
Norfork National Fish Hatchery	Arkansas
North Attleboro National Fish Hatchery	Massachusetts
Orangeburg National Fish Hatchery	South Carolina
Ouray National Fish Hatchery	Utah
Pendills Creek National Fish Hatchery	Michigan
Private John Allen National Fish Hatchery (ex-Tupelo National Fish Hatchery)	Mississippi
Quilcene National Fish Hatchery (part of the Puget Sound/Olympic; Peninsula Fisheries Complex)	Washington
Quinault National Fish Hatchery (part of the Puget Sound/Olympic; Peninsula Fisheries Complex)	Washington
Richard Cronin National Salmon Station	Massachusetts
San Marcos National Fish Hatchery	Texas
Saratoga National Fish Hatchery	Wyoming
Southwestern Native Aquatic Resources and Recovery Center	New Mexico
Spring Creek National Fish Hatchery (part of the Columbia River Gorge; National Fish Hatchery Complex)	Washington
Sullivan Creek National Fish Hatchery (ex-Hiawatha Forest National Fish Hatchery)	Michigan
Tishomingo National Fish Hatchery	Oklahoma
Uvalde National Fish Hatchery	Texas
Valley City National Fish Hatchery	North Dakota
Warm Springs National Fish Hatchery	Georgia
Warm Springs National Fish Hatchery (part of the Columbia River Gorge; National Fish Hatchery Complex)	Oregon
Welaka National Fish Hatchery	Florida
White River National Fish Hatchery	Vermont
White Sulphur Springs National Fish Hatchery	West Virginia
Willard National Fish Hatchery (part of the Columbia River Gorge; National Fish Hatchery Complex)	Washington
Williams Creek National Fish Hatchery (part of the Alchesay-Williams Creek; National Fish Hatchery Complex)	Arizona
Willow Beach National Fish Hatchery	Arizona
Winthrop National Fish Hatchery	Washington
Wolf Creek National Fish Hatchery	Kentucky
