= Alchesay Flat =

Landform in Navajo County, Arizona

Alchesay Flat, Arizona
- Physical feature
- Location of Alchesay Flat in Arizona
- Coordinates: 33°55′56″N 109°56′22″W
- Country: United States
- State: Arizona
- County: Navajo
- Elevation: 5,770 ft (1,760 m)
- Time zone: UTC-7 (Mountain (MST))
  - Summer (DST): UTC-7 (MST)
- ZIP codes: 85935
- Area code: 928
- GNIS feature ID: 570

Alchesay Flat is a physical feature, named flat, located approximately 7 miles (11 km) north of Whiteriver along Arizona State Route 73 in Navajo County, Arizona. It has an estimated elevation of 5,774 feet (1,760 m) above sea level.

It is located on the Fort Apache Indian Reservation, and is named for Chief Alchesay of the White Mountain Apache tribe, who is buried there.

The area is sparsely populated with the primary activity in the area being corn cultivation.

The Alchesay National Fish Hatchery, which became part of the Alchesay-Williams Creek National Fish Hatchery Complex in 10972, has operated there since 1968.
