= Harrison Lake National Fish Hatchery =

Fish hatchery in Virginia, United States

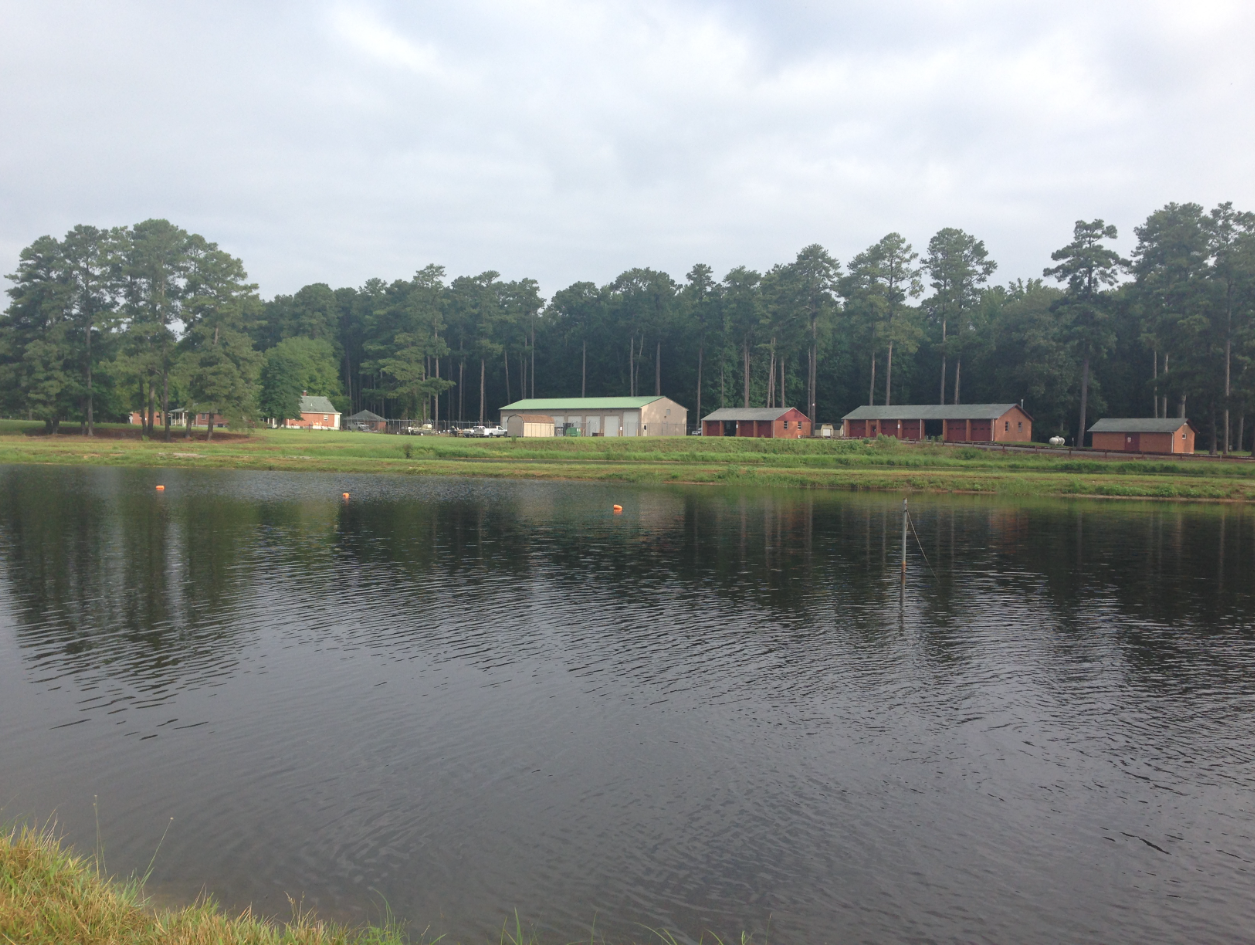

- Location within Virginia Location within the United States
- Location: Charles City, Virginia, United States
- Coordinates: 37.33757348890911°N 77.19135311656947°W
- Area: 444 acres (180 ha)
- Established: 1937
- Governing body: United States Fish and Wildlife Service
- Website: www.fws.gov/fish-hatchery/harrison-lake

The Harrison Lake National Fish Hatchery is a fish hatchery located near the James River in Charles City, Virginia, in the United States. It is managed and operated by the United States Fish and Wildlife Service. Like other components of the National Fish Hatchery System, the hatchery's mission is to conserve, protect, and enhance fish, wildlife, plants, and their habitats, as well to cooperate with like-minded partners to further these goals. As of 2025, its specific purpose is to produce migratory fish for the stocking of coastal rivers and their headwaters in the Chesapeake Bay area and participate in the restoration and preservation of freshwater mussel populations in the Mid-Atlantic region of the United States.

== Management ==
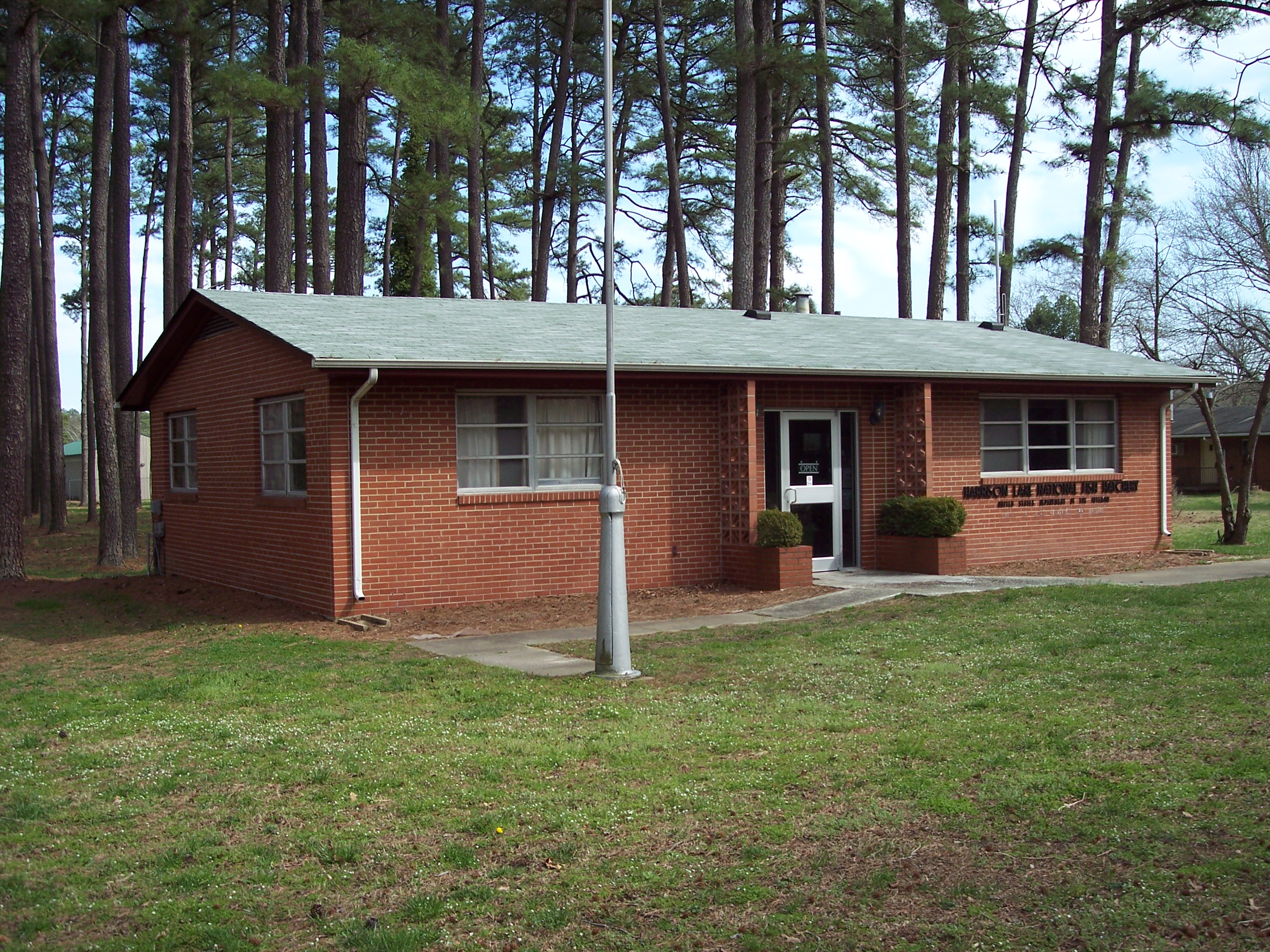
The hatchery office building on March 24, 2010.

The Harrison Lake National Fish Hatchery is managed at operated by the United States Fish and Wildlife Service.

== Activities ==
=== Fish production ===
Since the 1980s, the Harrison Lake National Fish Hatchery has focused its fish production efforts on migratory fish of commercial, recreational, and ecological importance in the Chesapeake Bay region, including alewives (Alosa pseudoharengus), American shad (Alosa sapidissima), and blueback herring (Alosa aestivalis). It produces millions of these fish each year for stocking in rivers in Maryland and Virginia, working with state and Native American tribal partners in efforts to restore and maintain alewife and blueback herring populations.

=== Freshwater mussels ===
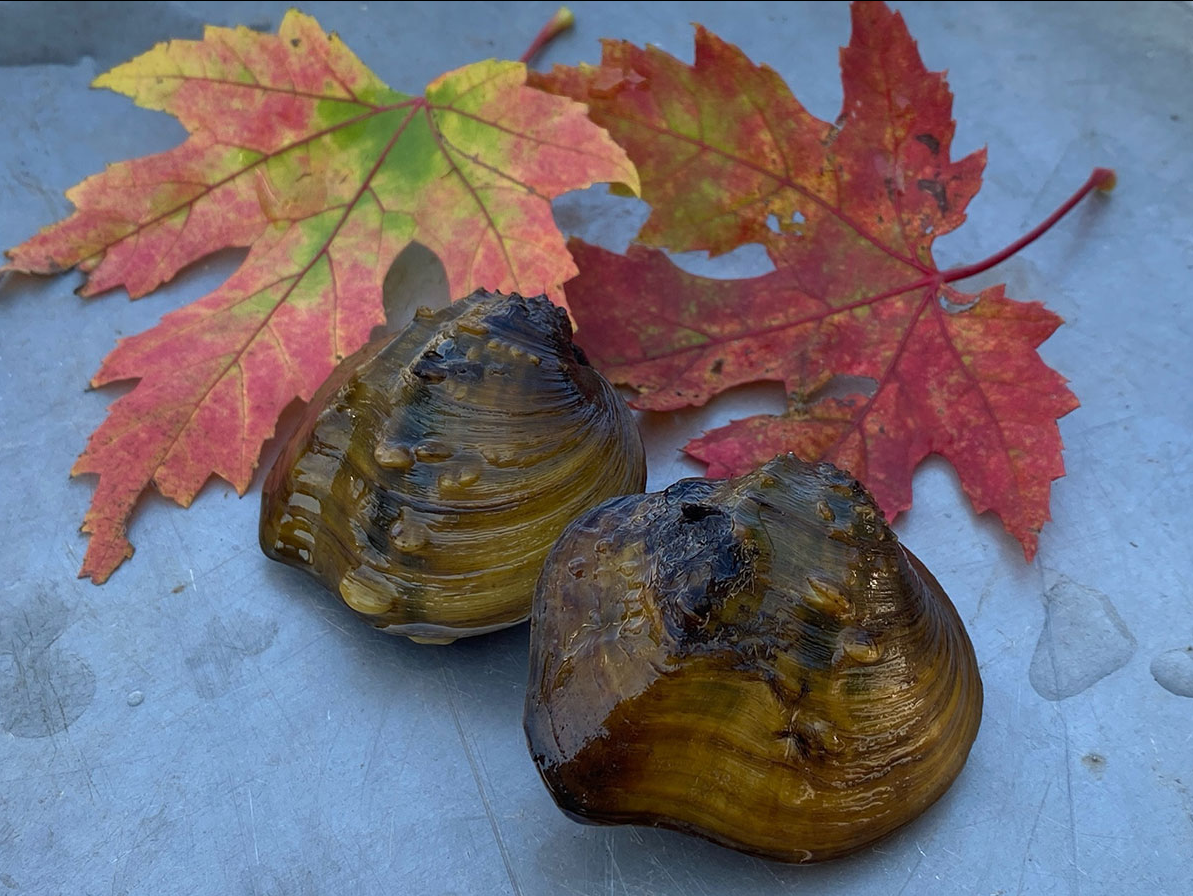
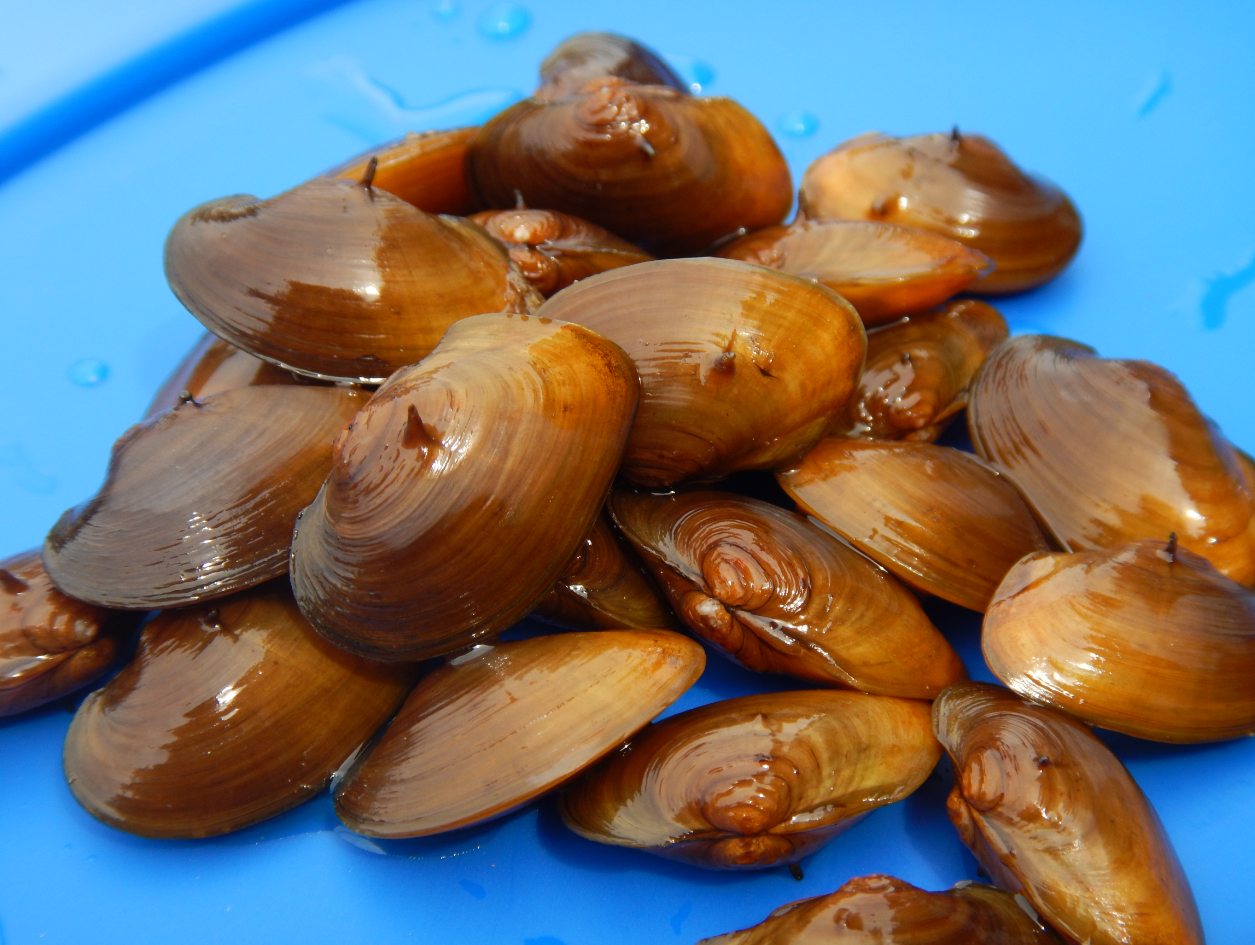
Freshwater mussels at the hatchery. LEFT: Mapleleaf (Quadrula quadrula) mussels with maple (genus Acer) leaves. RIGHT: James River spinymussels (Pleurobema collina) with small spines visible on the outside of their shells.

In 2007 the hatchery partnered with the Virginia Department of Wildlife Resources to form the Virginia Fisheries and Aquatic Wildlife Center (VFAWC). Located at the hatchery, the VFAWC raises freshwater mussels to restore and preserve their populations in Virginia, which in turn restores the ecosystems in rivers which rely on filter feeding by mussels to keep their waters clean and clear. Since the program began, the hatchery has released hundreds of thousands of tagged mussels from various species – a dozen different species according to one source, 20 according to another — in Virginia waters, stocking them in the Appomattox, Mattaponi, Meherrin, Nottoway, Pamunkey, Rappahannock, and South Rivers and the South Fork of the Shenandoah River. The VFAWC reached a major milestone in the summer of 2022 when it released young James River spinymussels (Parvaspina collina) into the upper James River, creating a population of the species in the main stem of the river for the first time in 60 years. By that summer, the hatchery also had stocked more than 3,000 James River spinymussels in three tributaries of the James River and one of the Dan River in Virginia to boost their local population densities and decrease the likelihood that a single catastrophic event could wipe out the entire species.

In addition to raising and stocking mussels, the hatchery assists other groups and institutions attempting to restore freshwater mussel populations throughout the Mid-Atlantic region of the United States. The work includes helping the Partnership for the Delaware Estuary to restore freshwater mussels in the Delaware River drainage basin and assisting other freshwater mussel restoration efforts in the Anacostia River in Maryland and in the Dan River in North Carolina and Virginia.

=== Tribal partnerships ===
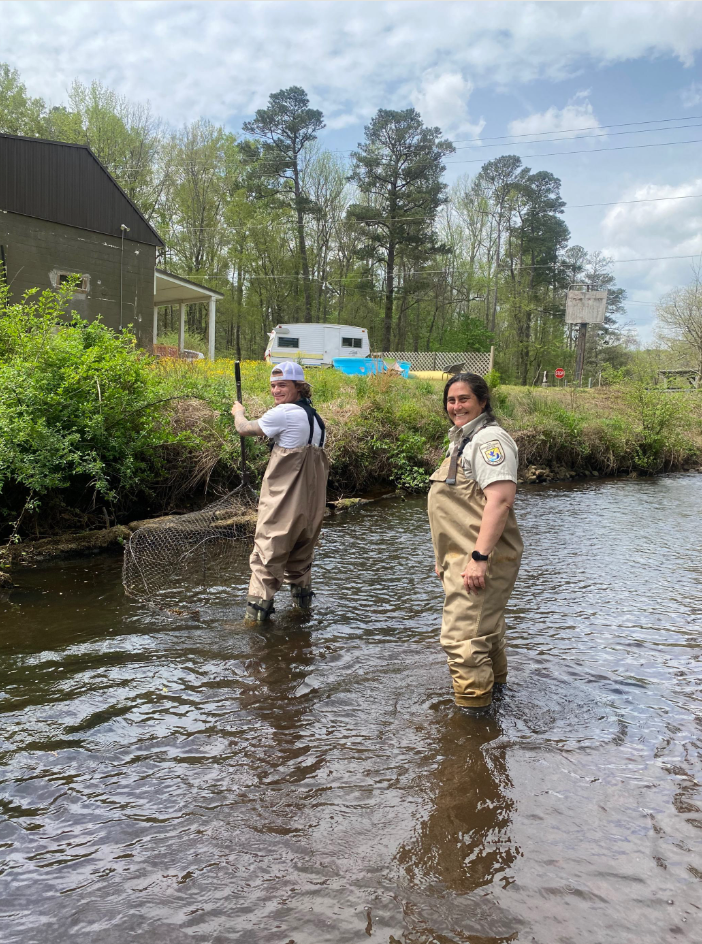
A Native American tribal citizen (left) trains as a hatchery technician during his internship at the hatchery alongside the hatchery's manager (right) on May 25, 2023.

By early 2023, the hatchery had begun a partnership with the Upper Mattaponi Tribe to help the tribe establish its own fish hatchery for native species within the next few years. Under the partnership, two tribal technicians employed by the Upper Mattaponi began 18-month internships at the hatchery, receiving training and working alongside the hatchery's staff.

=== Tours ===
The hatchery provides guided tours to youth, school, and home-school groups.

== History ==
The Civilian Conservation Corps constructed the Harrison Lake National Fish Hatchery during the 1930s on a portion of the property of the Berkeley Plantation — the birthplace of both Benjamin Harrison V (1726–1791), a Founding Father of the United States, and President William Henry Harrison (1773–1841), as well as the ancestral home of President Benjamin Harrison (1833–1901) — taking advantage of a mill race and mill pond (now known as Harrison Lake) constructed there in 1790. The hatchery opened in 1937, operated at the time by the United States Bureau of Fisheries, a component of the United States Department of Commerce. The Bureau of Fisheries merged with other agencies in 1940 to form the United States Department of the Interior's Fish and Wildlife Service, which in turn underwent a major reorganization in 1956 to become the United States Fish and Wildlife Service, under which the National Fish Hatchery System became a component of the new service's Bureau of Sport Fisheries and Wildlife.

Meanwhile, the hatchery spent its first several decades supporting recreational fishing in the Chesapeake Bay region by producing bass (clade Percomorpha), bluegill (Lepomis macrochirus), bream, catfish (order Siluriformes), and crappie (genus Pomoxis), which it stocked in public, military, and private waters. In the 1980s it shifted its focus to the restoration of populations of migratory fishes of the Chesapeake Bay and began to produce millions of fish such as alewife (Alosa pseudoharengus), American shad (Alosa sapidissima), and blueback herring (Alosa aestivalis) annually for the stocking of rivers in Maryland and Virginia. In 2007, the hatchery added support to the restoration and preservation of populations of native freshwater mussels in Maryland, Virginia, and parts of North Carolina to its activities.

After a pedestrian bridge providing access to recreational fishing piers and a pavilion on an island in Lake Harrison closed due to unsafe welds in its structure, ironworkers of the Union Sportsmen's Alliance and Iron Workers Local 28 volunteered to repair it. The bridge reopened to the public in the summer of 2024.

== Recreation ==
The Harrison Lake National Fish Hatchery is located in a rural setting on a 444-acre (180-hectare) parcel of land. It has a visitor center, and its grounds are open to the public and provide opportunities for hiking, birdwatching, wildlife viewing, wildlife photography, and picnicking. The hatchery's hiking-walking trails take visitors around the hatchery and through a large loblolly pine (Pinus taeda) forest, past wetlands, and along Herring Creek to Harrison Lake. The trails pass several historic sites, including the remains of the plowed furrows of a 19th-century cornfield (now the site of a mature forest) and an abandoned still from the 1960s. After the Seven Days Battles of the Peninsula Campaign during the American Civil War, troops of the Union Army's Army of the Potomac camped on what later became the hatchery's property for two months during the summer of 1862, and remains of their defensive earthworks are visible on the grounds.

The Virginia Capital Trail — a 51.7-mile (83.2 km) hiking and biking trail between Richmond and Williamsburg, Virginia – is adjacent to the hatchery grounds; the hatchery lies near its midpoint, between Mile 27 and Mile 28. In addition, five trails lie on the hatchery grounds:

- The Angler Trail is the hatchery's northernmost trail. It is partly paved and runs for 0.18 miles (0.3 km) from the Fishing Pier Parking Lot near the Harrison Lake boat ramp along the lake's southwestern shore. A pedestrian bridge from the trail provides access to a pavilion and two fishing piers located on an island in the southwest corner of Harrison Lake.
- The Picnic Area Trail is mostly paved and runs south and west for 0.05 miles (0.08 km) from the Fishing Pier Parking Lot just southwest of Harrison Lake.{
- The Lake Trail runs for 0.56 miles (0.9 km) from the Dam Creek Crossing North Parking area just south of Harrison Lake southward into the interior of the hatchery's property east of the hatchery buildings. It provides access to the Nature Trail.
- The Nature Trail runs from its junction with the Lake Trail through hatchery property farther to the south. It consists of a network of loops and shortcuts with a combined length of 1.34 miles (2.16 km).
- The Observation Platform Path is 0.02 miles (0.03 km) long and runs south from the Visitors Center Parking area.

Harrison Lake has a surface area of either 90 or 99 acres (36 or 40 hectares), according to different sources, and lies in a peaceful setting entirely within the hatchery's grounds. It serves as the hatchery's water supply reservoir. Recreational fishing and non-motorized boating are permitted on the lake, where anglers can catch a number of species including black crappie (Pomoxis nigromaculatus) and largemouth bass (Micropterus nigricans).

== See also ==
- National Fish Hatchery System
- List of National Fish Hatcheries in the United States
