= Dwight D. Eisenhower National Fish Hatchery =

Fish hatchery in Vermont, United States

Dwight D. Eisenhower National Fish Hatchery (ex-Pittsford National Fish Hatchery)
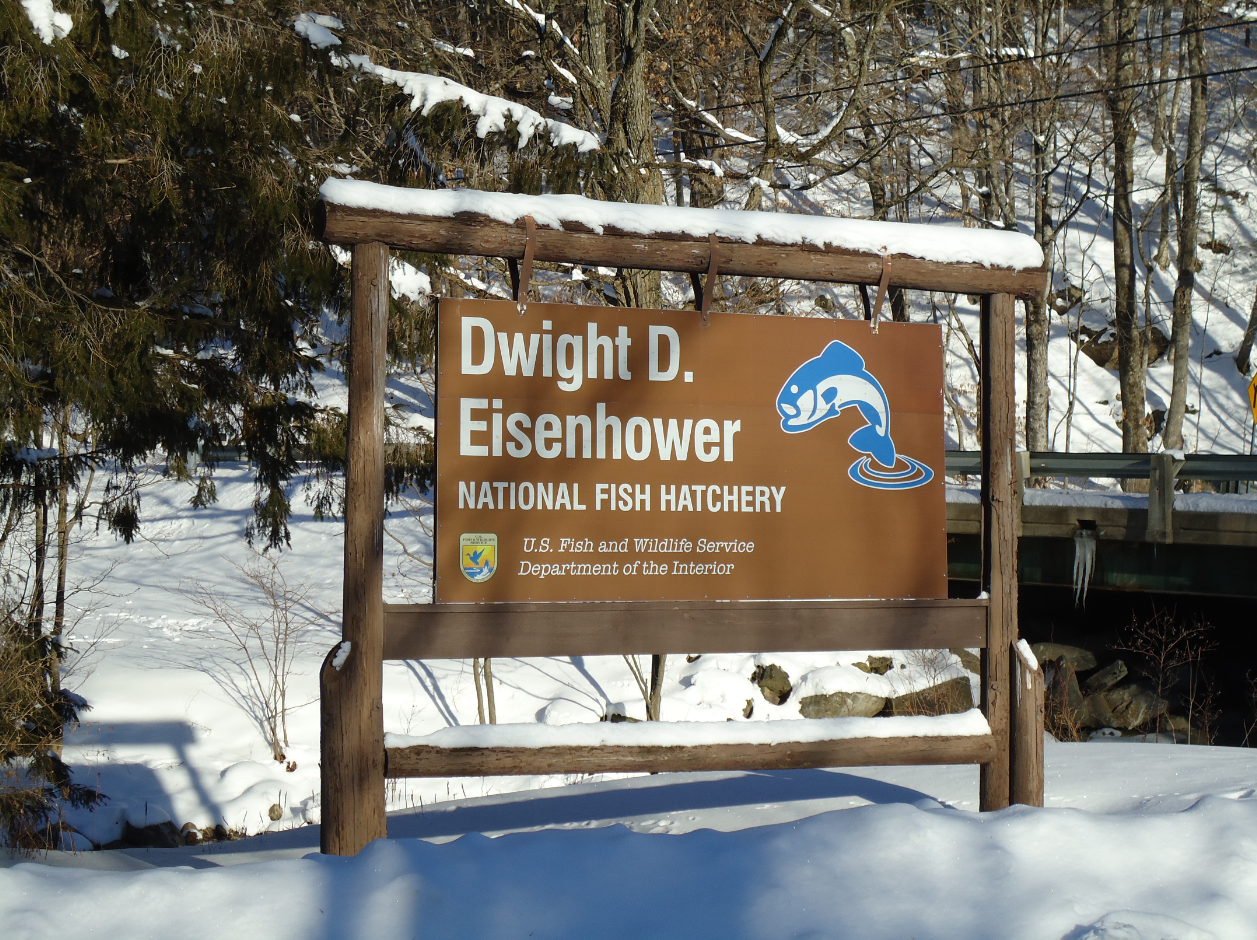

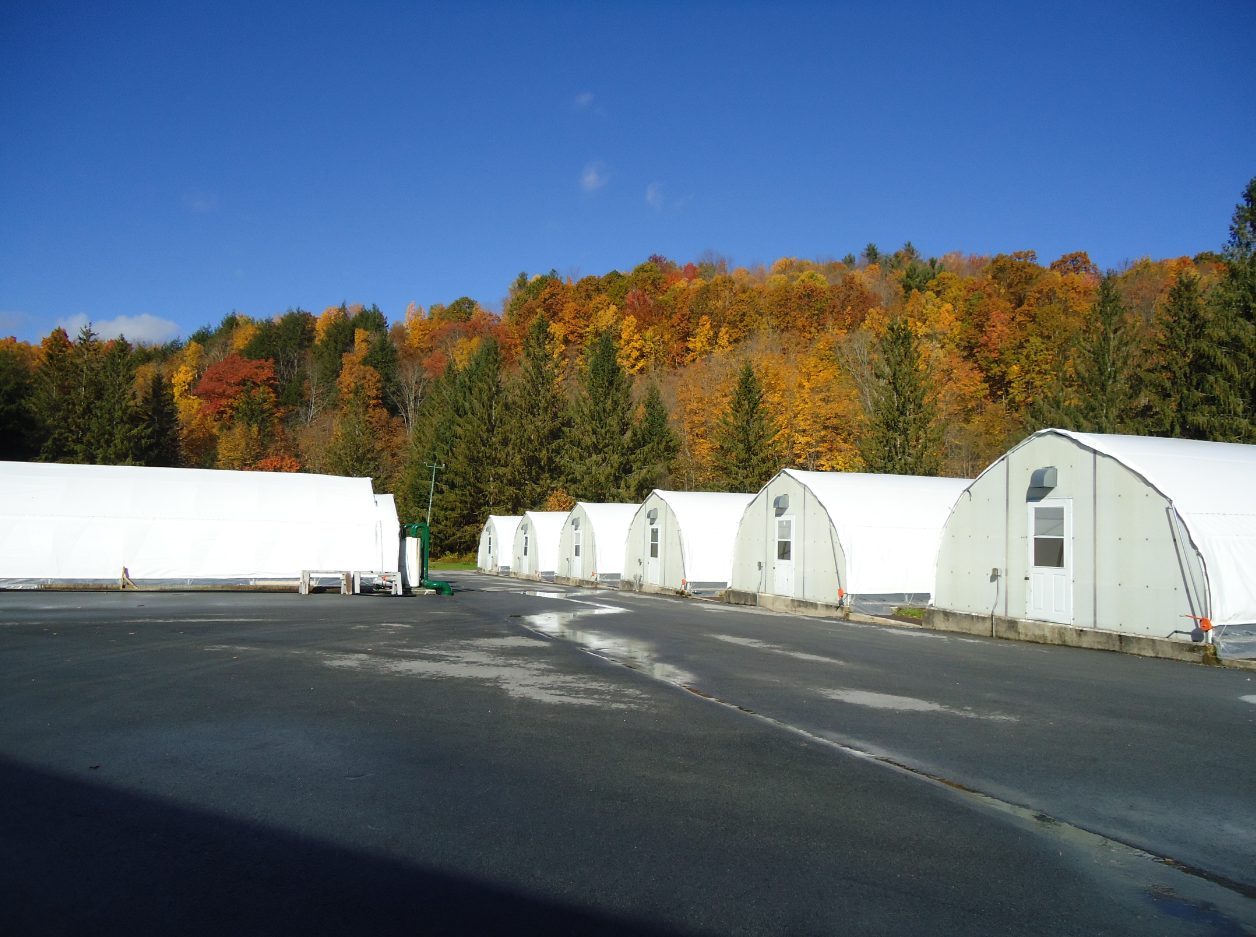
- Hatchery buildings.

- Location within Vermont Location within the United States
- Location: North Chittenden, Vermont, United States
- Coordinates: 43.74082078295861°N 72.97773778934697°W
- Area: 35 acres (14 ha)
- Established: 1909 (as Pittsford National Fish Hatchery)
- Named for: Pittsford, Vermont (1909–2009); Dwight D. Eisenhower (2009–present)
- Governing body: United States Fish and Wildlife Service
- Website: www.fws.gov/fish-hatchery/dwight-d-eisenhower

The Dwight D. Eisenhower National Fish Hatchery, known until 2009 as the Pittsford National Fish Hatchery, is a fish hatchery located in North Chittenden in Rutland County, Vermont, in the United States. It is managed and operated by the United States Fish and Wildlife Service. Like other components of the National Fish Hatchery System, the hatchery's mission is to conserve, protect, and enhance fish, wildlife, plants, and their habitats, as well to cooperate with like-minded partners to further these goals. As of 2025, its specific purpose is to support recreational fishing by producing landlocked Atlantic salmon (Salmo salar) for stocking in the Lake Champlain drainage basin and Lake Ontario, lake trout (Salvelinus namaycush) for stocking in the Great Lakes and Lake Champlain, and brook trout (Salvelinus fontinalis) for the stocking of local waterways in Vermont.

== History ==
The Dwight D. Eisenhower National Fish Hatchery traces its history to June 30, 1906, when the United States Congress provided funding for its construction under Congress 34 Statute 721. In 1906, the United States Bureau of Fisheries constructed a small fish-rearing station in the North Chittenden area which used 60 wooden troughs (long, shallow tanks) fed by water from Furnace Brook and natural springs. In these troughs, the station raised brook trout (Salvelinus fontinalis) each summer for three years.

The Bureau of Fisheries purchased land for the hatchery itself in 1909, and, after the construction of its first buildings, the hatchery opened as the Pittsford National Fish Hatchery that year, with its facilities fed by the waters of Furnace Brook. It initially produced salmonids, namely char (genus Salvelinus), salmon (family Salmonidae), and trout (subfamily Salmoninae), for stocking in the waters of New Hampshire, New York, and Vermont. From 1925 to 1940, it served as an experimental station focusing on culture of new species, fish nutrition, and selective breeding, and during these years it raised California golden trout (Oncorhynchus aguabonita or Oncorhynchus mykiss aguabonita), cutthroat trout (Oncorhynchus clarkii clade), rainbow trout (Oncorhynchus mykiss), brown trout (Salmo trutta) and their "Loch Leven" variety, lake trout (Salvelinus namaycush), brook trout, Arctic char (Salvelinus alpinus), and Arctic grayling (Thymallus arcticus). Between 1935 and 1945, the hatchery's manager, Russel Lord, directed some of the earliest fisheries science research into the survival of stocked trout after their release into the wild and the effects of fishing pressure on fish populations. Meanwhile, the Bureau of Fisheries merged with other agencies in 1940 to form the United States Department of the Interior's Fish and Wildlife Service.

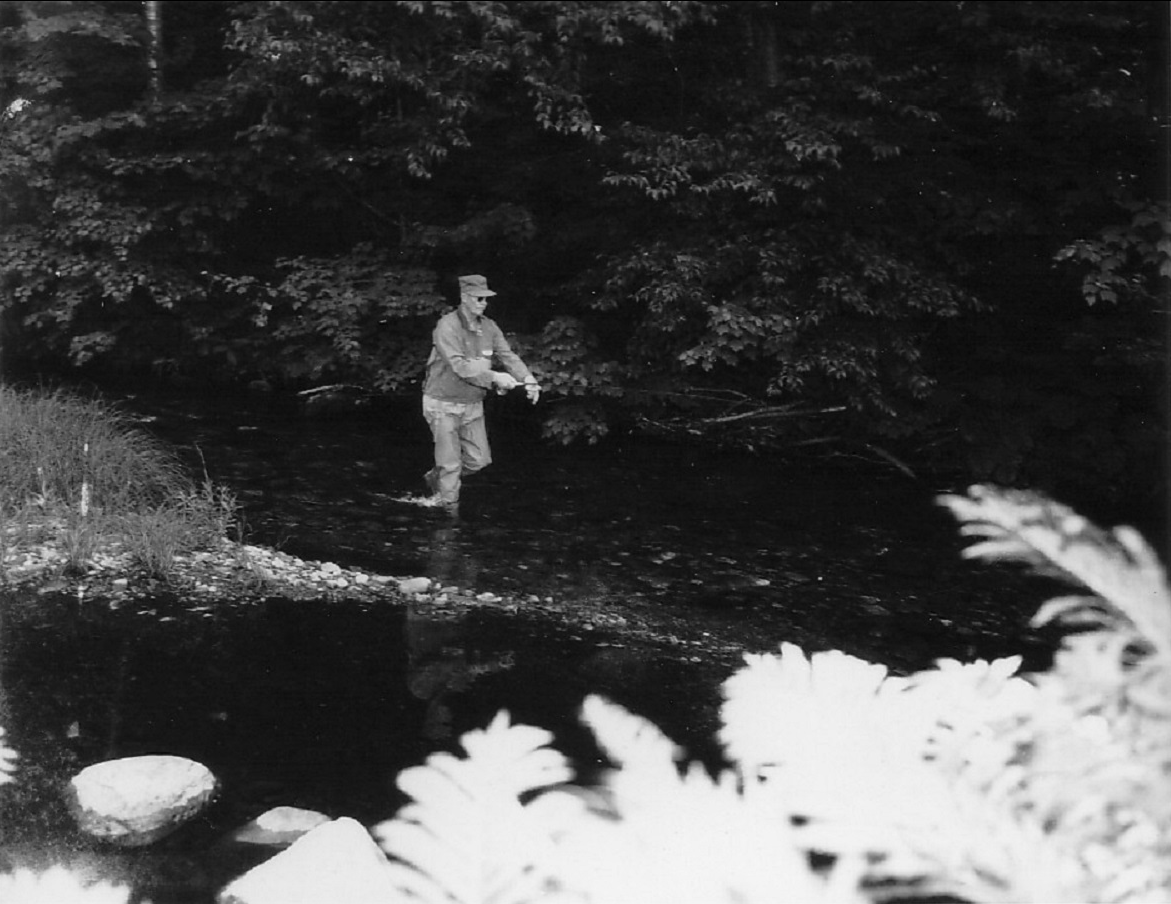
President Dwight D. Eisenhower fishes in Furnace Brook during a visit to what was then the Pittsford National Fish Hatchery in June 1955.

In June 1955 President Dwight D. Eisenhower visited the hatchery and went fly fishing for rainbow trout in Furnace Brook with a retired hatchery manager. A few months later, Eisenhower secured funding for a complete reconstruction of the hatchery. Fish production halted when the reconstruction project began in 1956, the year the Fish and Wildlife underwent a major reorganization and became the United States Fish and Wildlife Service, under which the National Fish Hatchery System became a component of the new service's Bureau of Sport Fisheries and Wildlife. After completion of the reconstruction, fish production resumed in 1959, with the rebuilt hatchery producing trout for stocking in the waters of Connecticut, Maine, Massachusetts, New Hampshire, New Jersey, New York, Pennsylvania, Rhode Island, and Vermont.

In 1968, the hatchery began raising sea-run Atlantic salmon (Salmo salar) as part of the Connecticut River Restoration Program. Thanks in part to the hatchery's work, the first Atlantic salmon in over a century returned from the Atlantic Ocean in 1974 to swim up the Connecticut River and spawn. The hatchery produced the first tagged salmon to ascend the Connecticut River along with most of the adult salmon returning to the Connecticut River. The Connecticut River salmon program ended in 2014.

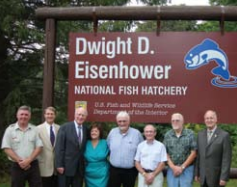
Attending the hatchery's renaming ceremony in August 2009 were, from left, hatchery manager Henry Bouchard, regional director Marvin Moriarty, U.S. Senator Patrick Leahy, select board chairwoman Donnaleen Farwell, select board members Gary Congdon, Dave Sargent, and Robert Bearor, and Vermont Governor Jim Douglas.

In 1980, the hatchery began raising landlocked Atlantic salmon and lake trout for the Lake Champlain Restoration Program. As a result, a thriving fishery for the two species was established in Lake Champlain. The hatchery raised approximately 60 percent of the landlocked Atlantic salmon produced for Lake Champlain between 1980 and 2005. The hatchery discontinued the stocking of lake trout in Lake Champlain in 1995, but later expanded its lake trout work to help restore lake trout populations in Lake Erie and Lake Ontario, in addition to raising brook trout for Vermont waters. Between 1999 and 2004, the hatchery assisted the Government of New York with lake sturgeon (Acipenser fulvescens) production for the stocking of the St. Lawrence River and the Finger Lakes.

To commemorate Eisenhower's June 1955 visit, the hatchery was renamed the Dwight D. Eisenhower National Fish Hatchery in August 2009. (Note: The United States Fish and Wildlife Service's "Hatchery Road Trip - Dwight D. Eisenhower!" page claims the hatchery was renamed when it reopened after its major reconstruction was completed in 1959, while Eisenhower was still in office and 50 years before the August 2009 renaming ceremony documented elsewhere.) Vermont Senator Patrick Leahy, who was responsible for the language in the omnibus bill that changed the hatchery’s name, spoke at the renaming ceremony and highlighted the facility’s contribution to the fisheries resources of Vermont and its economic impact. Governor of Vermont Jim Douglas also attended.

== Management ==
The United States Fish and Wildlife Service manages and operates the Dwight D. Eisenhower National Fish Hatchery.

== Activities ==
=== Landlocked Atlantic salmon ===
Landlocked Atlantic salmon disappeared from Lake Champlain around 1900 thanks to the construction of dams which cut the fish off from their spawning grounds and to siltation and pollution from agriculture and urban growth. The then-Pittsford National Fish Hatchery began producing Atlantic salmon when it opened in 1909, and it has continued to hatch and raise the species ever since. Since 1980, the hatchery has participated in the Lake Champlain Restoration Program, and its stocking of the lake and habitat restoration work have created a thriving Atlantic salmon fishery in the lake.

=== Lake trout ===
Lake trout disappeared from Lake Champlain around 1900 due to dam construction, siltation, pollution, commercial fishing around spawning grounds, and the arrival in the lake of the sea lamprey (Petromyzon marinus), an invasive species. The hatchery produced lake trout for the Lake Champlain Restoration Program from 1980 to 1995. After that, it continued to raise lake trout and stock them in waters throughout Vermont (except Lake Champlain) in partnership with the Government of Vermont. The hatchery also stocks lake trout in Lake Ontario in support of the Great Lakes Restoration Initiative.

=== Brook trout ===
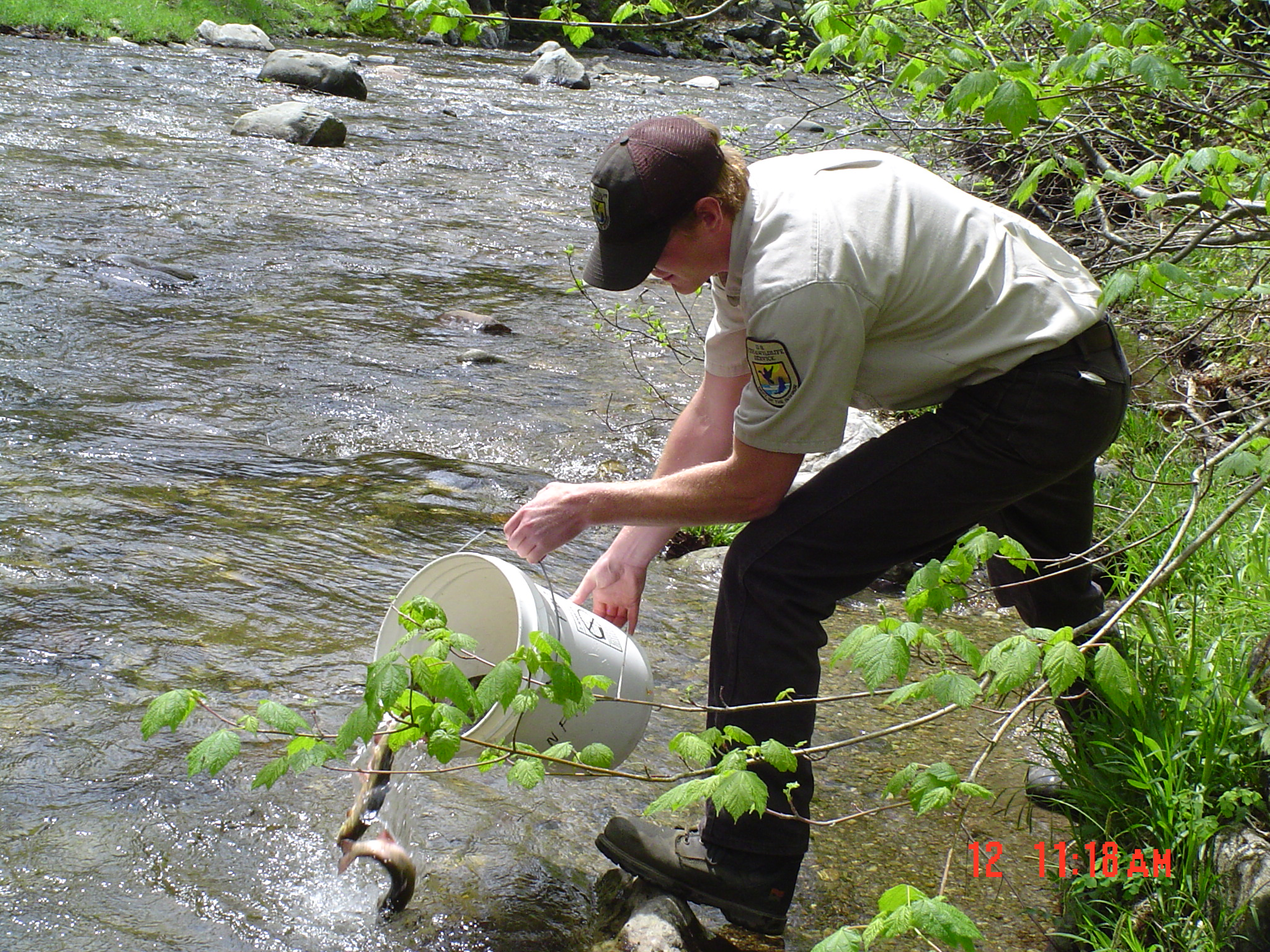
A hatchery employee stocks brook trout (Salvelinus fontinalis) in May 2010.

Once abundant in eastern North America from Maine to Georgia, as far north as Hudson Bay, and in the Great Lakes drainage basins, brook trout went into decline because of the damming of rivers, deforestation that led to siltation in waterways, poor agricultural practices, the construction of roads with undersized culverts, acid rain, and the introduction of non-native species such as brown trout and rainbow trout. Under a special agreement with the Vermont Fish and Wildlife Department, the hatchery raises brook trout which it stocks in waters throughout Vermont to restore and maintain populations of the species, which is of cultural, economic, and recreational importance in the state.

=== Water supply ===
The hatchery's primary water supply is Furnace Brook, a clean, soft water with high oxygen content. The brook's water also provides the seasonal fluctuations in temperature, hardness, and pH that closely approximate what the fish would encounter in nature, making the fish the hatchery produces better adapted to their natural environment when they are stocked in the wild. The water supply is gravity-fed and therefore is not pumped or chilled, making the hatchery one of the least expensive in the National Fish Hatchery System in terms of operating costs.

=== Education and outreach ===
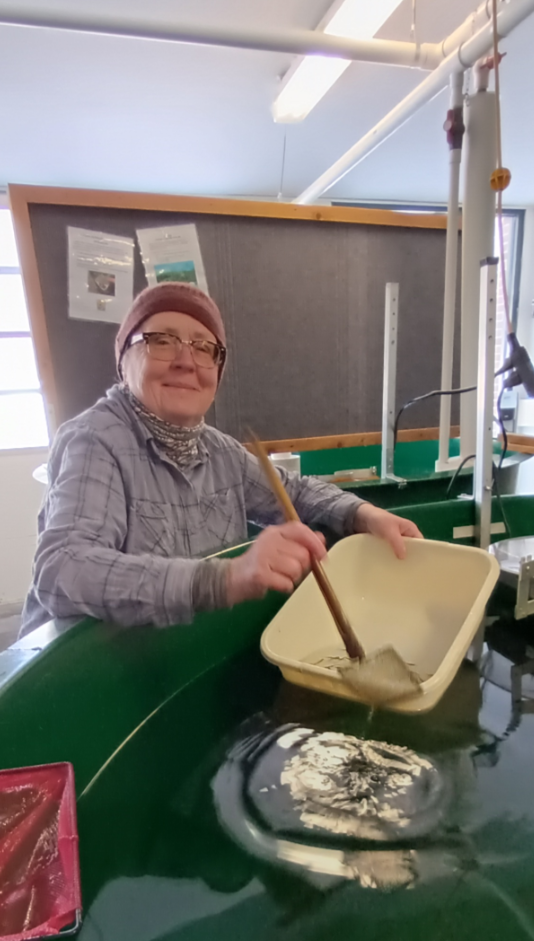
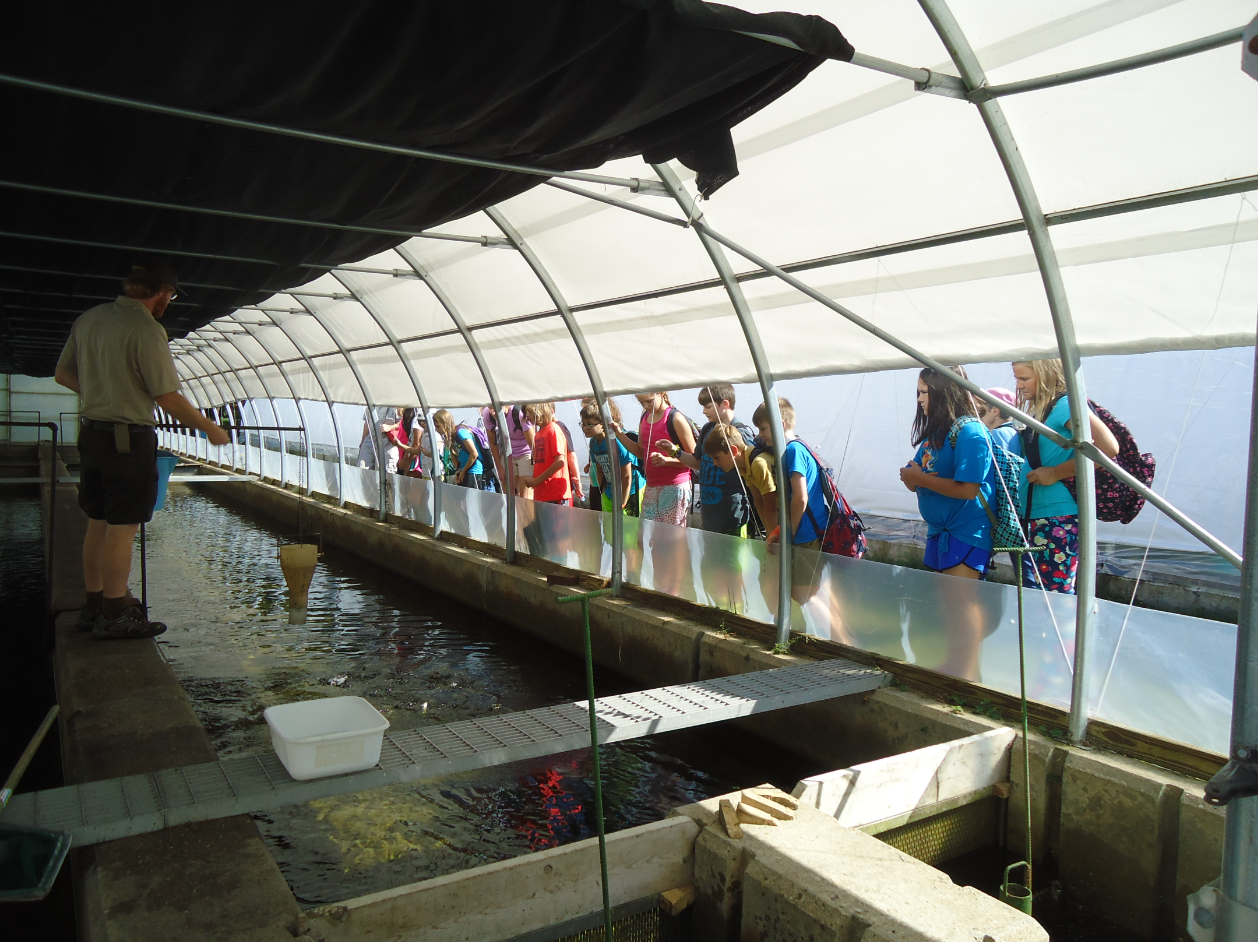
LEFT: A volunteer feeds fish at the hatchery on April 16, 2025. RIGHT: A school group tours the hatchery on September 15, 2021.

The hatchery provides formalized work-training credit through youth employment and internships for high school and college students enrolled in biological sciences or natural resources programs. The hatchery also assists the United States Department of Agriculture's Natural Resources Conservation Service by hosting an annual "Science at the Hatchery" day.

The hatchery offers guided tours to youth, school, and home-school groups. It also participates in the Vermont Fish and Wildlife Department's "Trout in the Classroom" program, an educational outreach initiative in which hatchery employees visit schools and bring trout into classrooms.

=== Volunteering ===
The hatchery offers a variety of volunteer opportunities involving caring for fish and facility maintenance. As of 2025, it was seeking volunteers willing to establish and operate a nonprofit "Friends of the Dwight D. Eisenhower National Fish Hatchery" group that would assist the hatchery in sponsoring youth programs focused on recreational fishing and other forms of outdoor recreation.

== Recreation ==
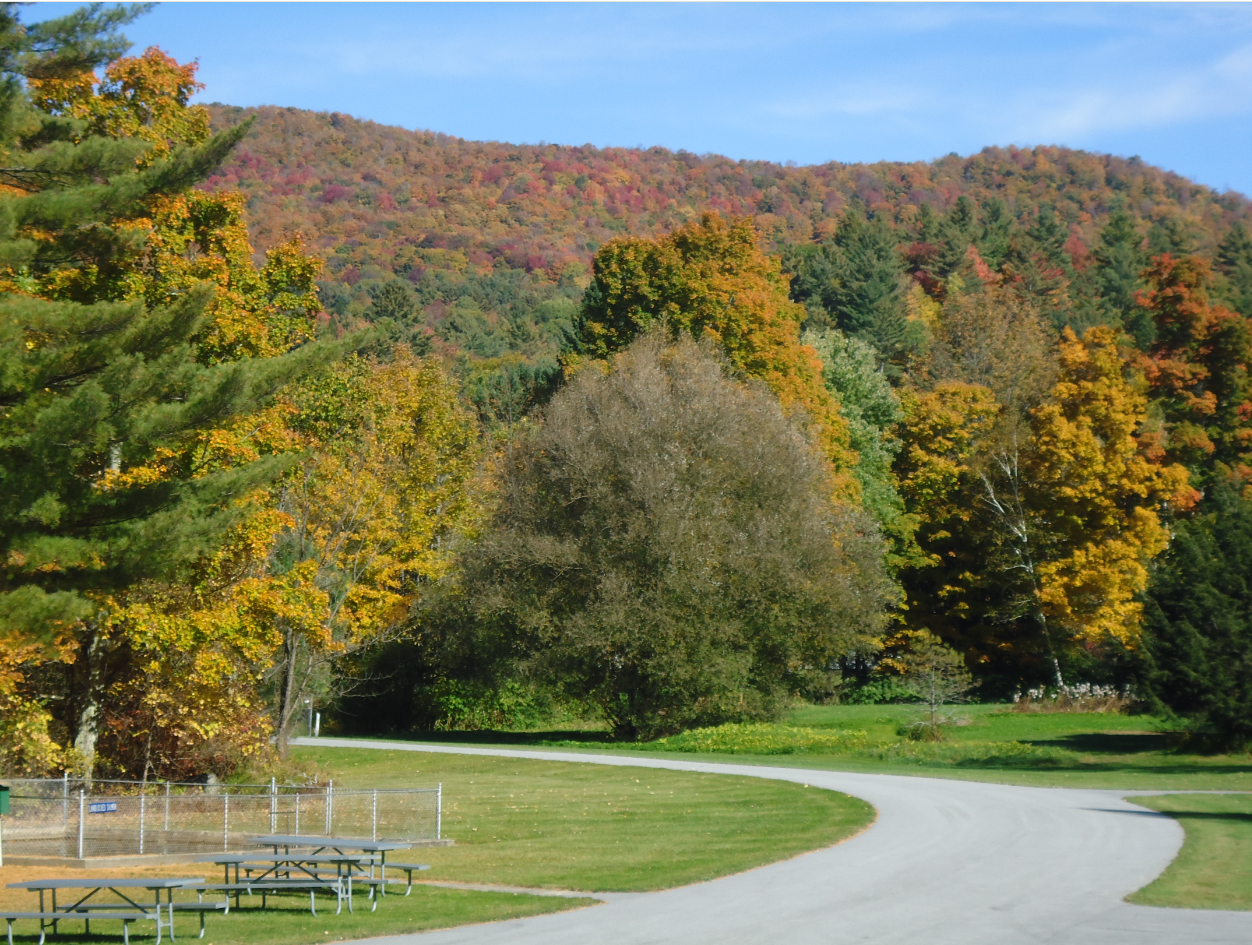
The hatchery grounds on September 15, 2021.

The Dwight D. Eisenhower National Fish Hatchery is located in the Green Mountains of Vermont, allowing visitors to take a scenic drive on their way to and from the hatchery. The hatchery is open to the public on weekdays year-round. Visitors can see thousands of fish, feed the large salmon in the hatchery's display pool, and enjoy educational opportunities. The 35-acre (14-hectare) grounds offer opportunities for wildlife observation and wildlife photography. Although fishing gear is prohibited around the hatchery's raceways and fish culture areas and fishing is not allowed within 50 feet (15 m) of the hatchery's water intake in Furnace Brook, recreational fishing otherwise is permitted on hatchery grounds in Furnace Brook, where anglers primarily catch brook trout, brown trout, and rainbow trout.

== See also ==
- National Fish Hatchery System
- List of National Fish Hatcheries in the United States
