= Orangeburg National Fish Hatchery =

Fish hatchery and park in South Carolina, United States

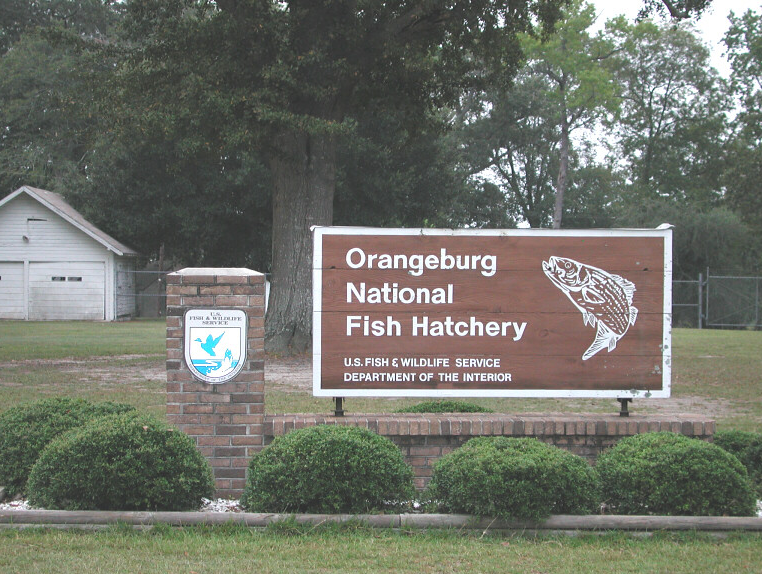

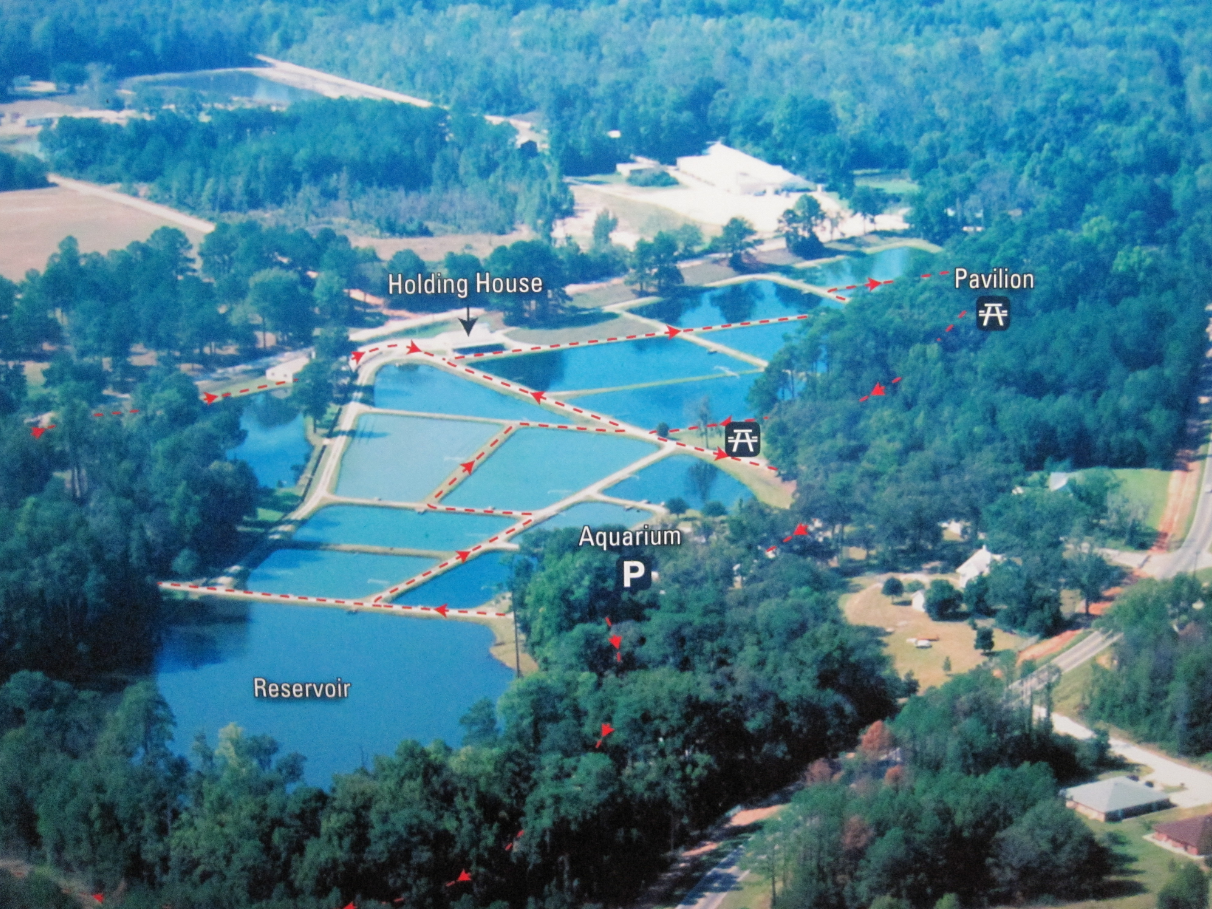
- An annotated aerial view of the Orangeburg National Fish Hatchery's main station.

- Location within South Carolina Location within the United States
- Location: Orangeburg County, South Carolina, United States
- Coordinates: 33.469222519469675°N 80.85581255902314°W
- Area: 250 acres (100 ha)
- Established: 1911
- Governing body: United States Fish and Wildlife Service
- Website: www.fws.gov/fish-hatchery/orangeburg

The Orangeburg National Fish Hatchery is a fish hatchery administered by the United States Fish and Wildlife Service in Orangeburg County, South Carolina, in the United States. It is a component of the National Fish Hatchery System. It lies on 250 acres (101 hectares) of land and consists of two units, a main station just outside the city limits of Orangeburg, South Carolina, and a substation located 7 miles (11 km) to the southwest. Like other components of the National Fish Hatchery System, the hatchery's mission is to conserve, protect, and enhance fish, wildlife, plants, and their habitats, as well to cooperate with like-minded partners to further these goals.

== Management ==
The Orangeburg National Fish Hatchery is managed and operated by the United States Fish and Wildlife Service. The hatchery collaborates with a wide variety of partners, including other United States Government and South Carolina government natural resource agencies, local governments, universities, private landowners, and community organizations.

== Activities ==
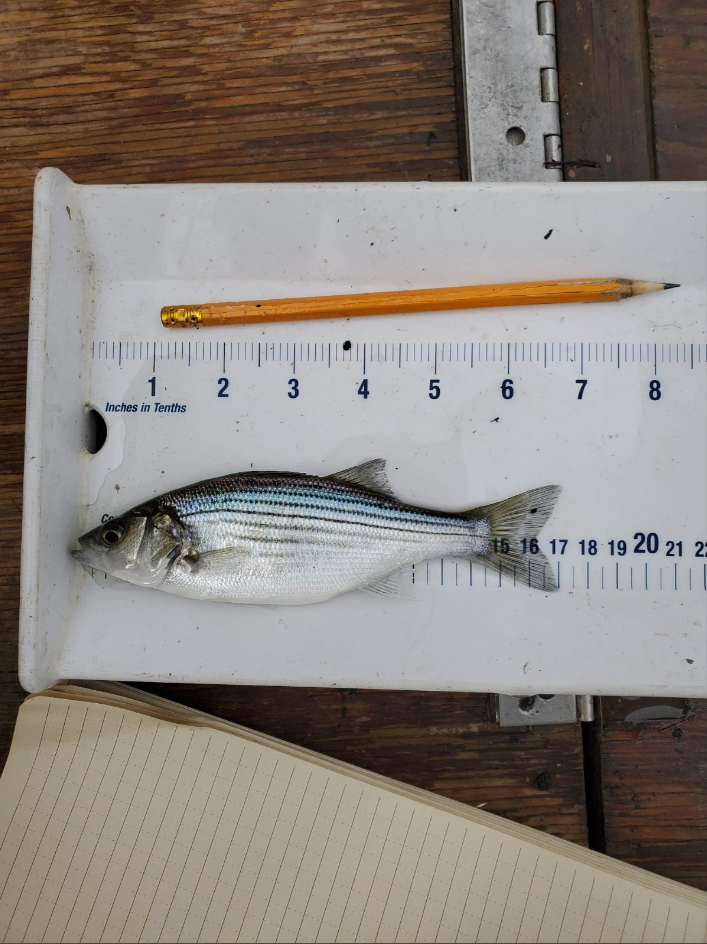
A striped bass (Morone saxatilis) is measured at the hatchery.

The Orangeburg National Fish Hatchery produces about 7 million fish, frogs, and freshwater mussels a year. It is a warm-water facility, meaning that it hatches and raises fish that do best in water temperatures between 60 and 85 °F (16 and 29 °C) according to one source, or between 65 and 80 °F (18 and 27 °C) according to another. It raises bluegills (Lepomis macrochirus), channel catfish (Ictalurus punctatus), and redbreast sunfish (Lepomis auritus) in outdoor earthen ponds to enhance declining and depleted populations of those fish, and American shad (Alosa sapidissima) and striped bass (Morone saxatilis) to mitigate the effect on those species of the construction of dams. It stocks these fish in lakes, reservoirs, and rivers in South Carolina between the Edisto River and Lake Murray and outside of South Carolina in places as far away as Lake Shelbyville in Illinois. The hatchery uses indoor facilities to produce lake sturgeon (Acipenser fulvescens) for the restoration of populations in the Tennessee River drainage basin.

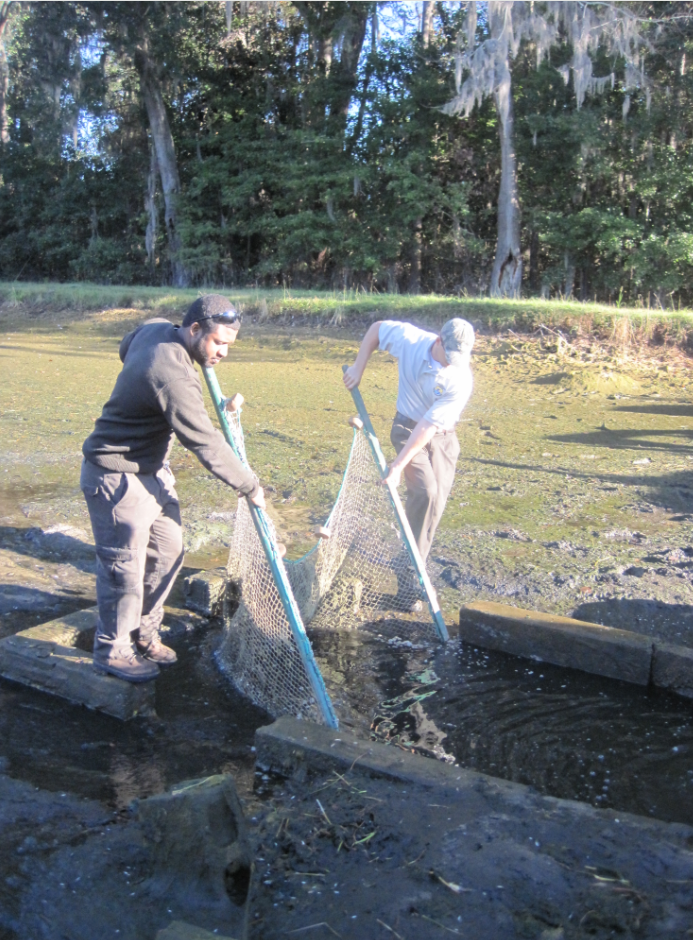
Employees seining a pond kettle at the hatchery in 2021.

The hatchery's fish ponds range in size from 0.5 to 1.5 acres (0.2 to 0.6 hectares). To ensure natural food production for fish less than 1 inch (25 mm) in length, the hatchery's staff adds fertilizers to the pond water to support the growth of phytoplankton and zooplankton the young fish rely on. After hatching striped bass, the hatchery stocks the young fish into ponds when they are less than 10 days old and less than 1 inch (25 mm) in length at a rate of 100,000 to 150,000 fish per surface acre (247,105 to 370,658 per surface hectare) of water. The striped bass remain in the ponds until they reach a length of between 2 and 12 inches (51 and 305 mm). In contrast, redbreast sunfish and bluegills are produced from adult fish (broodstock) that are stocked in ponds at a rate of 50 to 60 pairs per surface acre (124 to 148 pairs per surface hectare) and then allowed to reproduce naturally. They are harvested when they reach an average length of 3 inches (76 mm). While in the ponds, the fish feed on naturally occurring organisms as well as food supplied by the hatchery's staff.

To harvest the fish from a pond, the hatchery's staff lowers the water level to force the fish to concentrate in a pond kettle (a concrete basin in the pond), then uses a seine net to capture the fish. The fish that are to be stocked in public waterways then are placed in a distribution tank containing water and oxygen and hauled by truck to the stocking site. On average, 50,000 to 100,000 fish are hauled per trip, the number varying depending on the size of the fish and the distance to the stocking site.

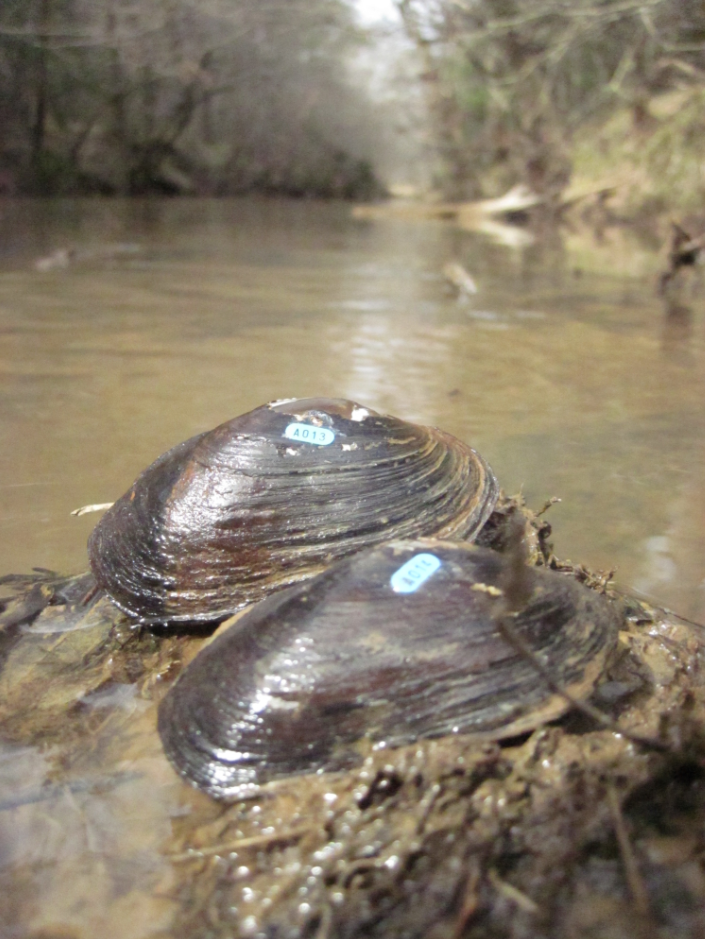
Adult Carolina heelsplitters (Lasmigona decorata) in their native habitat.

In addition to its work with fish, the hatchery takes part in restoring populations of the endangered gopher frog (Lithobates capito) and Carolina heelsplitter (Lasmigona decorata), a freshwater mussel. The hatchery conducts research involving the frogs and mussels and helps augment lost or dwindling populations of them.

== History ==
The Orangeburg National Fish Hatchery was established and constructed in 1911. As of 2003 it produced various species including bluegills, redbreast sunfish, and striped bass and stocked 4 to 5 million fish annually in lakes, reservoirs, and coastal streams across the southeastern United States. As of 2003 and through at least 2011 it also was participating in a United States Fish and Wildlife Service investigation of culture techniques for the shortnose sturgeon (Acipenser brevirostrum) and kept adults and fingerlings of the species on site for research purposes.

== Recreation ==
The Orangeburg National Fish Hatchery is open to the public year-round. The grounds at the main station include a sheltered picnic area, an outdoor education area and a public aquarium which is open on weekdays and displays the fish species produced at the hatchery. The grounds also include the Observation Walk, an easy 1-mile (1.6 km) walking and hiking loop trail that leads from the aquarium parking lot to the picnic area, then around the fish ponds and past the holding houses to an observation deck overlooking the main station's reservoir before returning to the parking lot. The trail provides opoortunities for wildlife observation, wildlife photography, and birdwatching. Species that visitors can observe on the station's grounds include Canada geese (Branta canadensis), great blue herons (Ardea herodias), snowy egrets (Egretta thula), wood storks (Mycteria americana), and American alligators (Alligator mississippiensis). Duck boxes on the grounds attract wood ducks (Aix sponsa), and the Observation Walk also passes a wide variety of plants and flowers which are described along the trail.

The substation, located 7 miles (11 km) to the southwest, is used mainly for fish production, but also is open to the public. Its grounds include a number of undeveloped trails that offer hiking and birdwatching opportunities. The substation also includes a body of water — described by different sources as a 75-acre (30-hectare) pond and as a 100-acre (40-hectare) reservoir — that is open to the public for boating and recreational fishing, typically for bluegill, bowfin (Amia calva), channel catfish, and largemouth bass (Micropterus nigricans).

== See also ==
- National Fish Hatchery System
- List of National Fish Hatcheries in the United States
