= Williams Creek National Fish Hatchery =

Fish hatchery in Arizona, United States

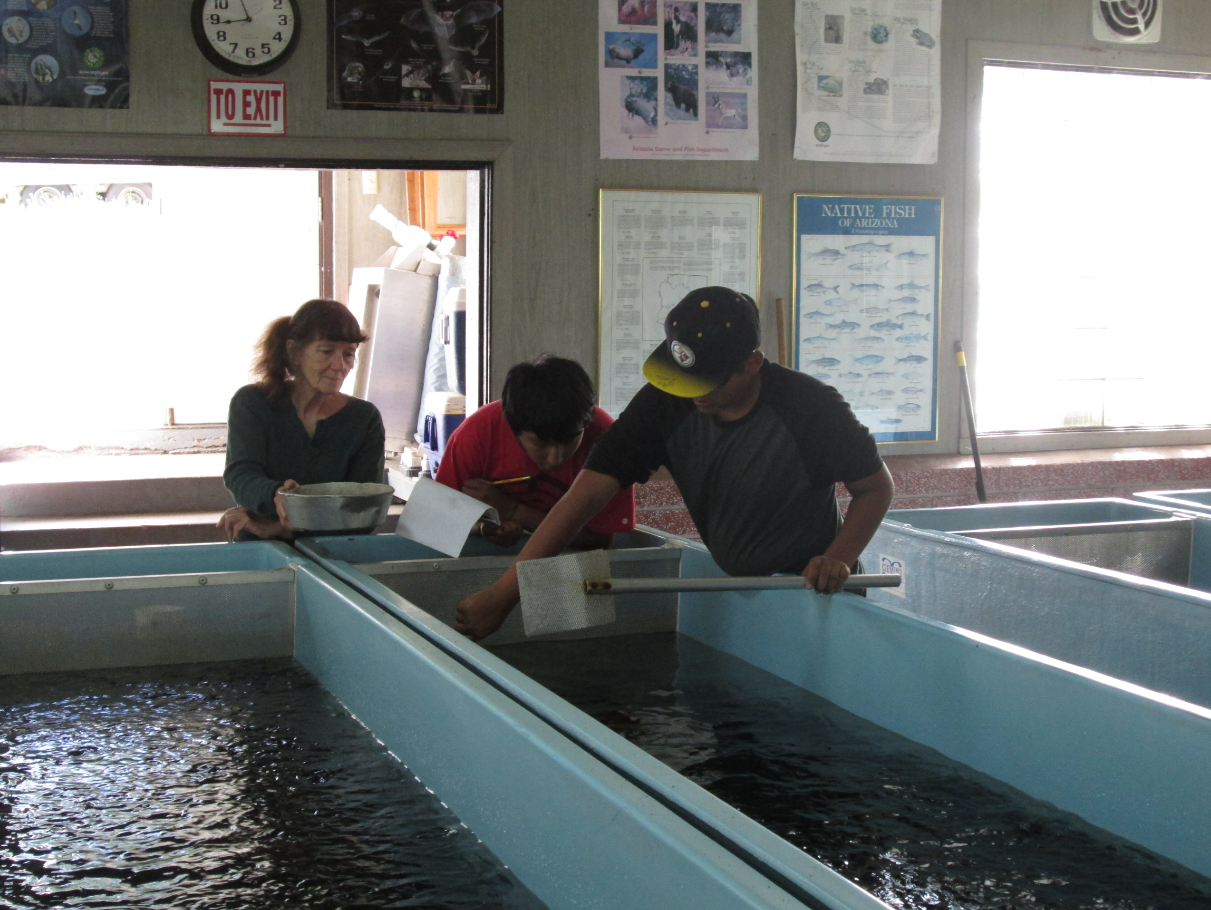
- Volunteers assisting with work at the Williams Creek National Fish Hatchery.

- Location within Arizona Location within the United States
- Location: Apache County, Arizona, United States
- Coordinates: 34.06132951043298°N 109.8059119420934°W
- Established: 1941
- Governing body: United States Fish and Wildlife Service
- Website: www.fws.gov/fish-hatchery/williams-creek

The Williams Creek National Fish Hatchery is a fish hatchery administered by the United States Fish and Wildlife Service located on the Fort Apache Indian Reservation in Apache County, Arizona, in the United States near McNary, Arizona. Like other components of the National Fish Hatchery System, the hatchery's mission is to conserve, protect, and enhance fish, wildlife, plants, and their habitats, as well to cooperate with like-minded partners to further these goals. Its specific purpose is to serve as a multi-species trout-rearing facility to produce fish which are stocked in Native American tribal waters in eastern Arizona and western New Mexico.

== History ==
In 1934, the United States Fish and Wildlife Service (USFWS) signed a memorandum of understanding with the United States Government's Bureau of Indian Affairs that authorized the establishment of the Williams Creek National Fish Hatchery. Construction of the hatchery began in 1939, with the Bureau of Indian Affairs providing the funds for labor, material, and construction and the USFWS providing planning, design, and technical supervision during construction.

The hatchery began operations in 1941, when it received 100,000 "eyed" (i.e., with larvae in the eggs showing developed eyes) rainbow trout eggs from northern New Mexico and 250,000 “blackspotted” trout eggs from Yellowstone National Park in Wyoming. From its inception, the facility had a mission of restoring Apache trout (Oncorhynchus apache) populations, but had no success in raising the species during its first year of operation. Its lack of success continued obver the succeeeding decades, and by 1967, Apache trout populations had dwindled, restricting them to approximately 30 miles (48 km) of stream habitat. In 1983, research efforts began in an attempt to improve production of the Apache trout, and the hatchery finally began to succeed in spawning Apache trout eggs: By 1986, the Apache trout program successfully spawned 60,000 eggs. By the early 2020s, the program ha improved to the point that it successfully spawned approximately 700,000 Apache trout eggs each year.

In 1972, operations at the Williams Creek National Fish Hatchery were combined with those of the Alchesay National Fish Hatchery to form the Alchesay-Williams Creek National Fish Hatchery Complex.

== Management ==
The United States Fish and Wildlife Service (USFWS) operates the Williams Creek National Fish Hatchery. It is a component of the Alchesay-Williams Creek National Fish Hatchery Complex, which also includes the Alchesay Creek National Fish Hatchery, located about 11 miles (18 km) to the south-southwest, about 9 miles (14 km) north of Whiteriver, Arizona.

== Activities ==
A major focus of the Williams Creek National Fish Hatchery is production of Apache trout to preserve and restore the population of the species. It is the only facility with a broodstock of Apache trout. Since the early 2020s it has succeeded in producing 700,000 Apache trout eggs per year, 225,000 of which it provides to the Government of Arizona annually. Apache trout raised at the hatchery stock over 18 lakes and 10 streams in the White Mountains in the Fort Apache Indian Reservation in Arizona. In addition, the hatchery raises brook trout (Salvelinus fontinalis) for stocking the waters of eastern Arizona and western New Mexico.

The hatchery also hatches brown trout (Salmo trutta) and rainbow trout (Oncorhynchus mykiss). When fingerlings of those species reach a length of 3 to 6 inches (7.6 to 15.2 cm) it transfers them to the Alchesay National Fish Hatchery, which serves as a "grow-out rearing unit" for the juvenile fish. When the fish reach a length of 6 to 10 inches (15 to 25 cm), the Alchesay National Fish Hatchery stocks waterways on 17 different Indian reservations and pueblos in eastern Arizona and western New Mexico with about 600,000 of the fish each year.

The waters stocked with brown and rainbow trout raised at the two hatcheries lie in the Fort Apache Indian Reservation, the Jicarilla Apache Reservation, the San Carlos Apache Indian Reservation, and Mescalero Apache Reservation, the Acoma Pueblo, the Isleta Pueblo, the Laguna Pueblo, the Nambe Pueblo, the Ohkay Owingeh Pueblo, the Picuris Pueblo, the Sandia Pueblo, the San Ildefonso Pueblo, the Santa Clara Pueblo, the Zia Pueblo, the Zuni Pueblo, the Navajo Nation in both Arizona and New Mexico, and the Hopi Reservation. The yearly production of fish by the two hatcheries represents the largest inland recreational fishing program on Indian trust land in the National Fish Hatchery System. Nonetheless, it usually falls far short of the annual demand for the fish.

== Recreation ==
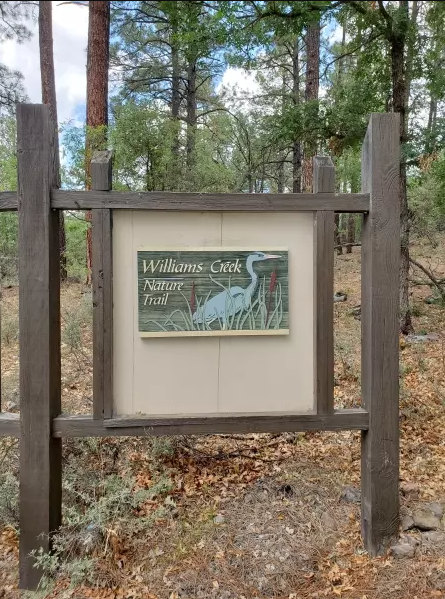
The sign at the trailhead of the Williams Creek Nature Trail on the hatchery grounds.

The Williams Creek National Fish Hatchery lies in a scenic area in the White Mountains. In addition to the picturesque scenery, visitors may view the trout the hatchery breeds at various points n their life cycle, depending on the time of year of the visit. Visitors also can observe multiple species of animals and plants on the hatchery's grounds, and picnicking, hiking, wildlife photography, and birdwatching are permitted.

The grounds include the Williams Creek Nature Trail, a rock-lined 0.15-mile (0.25 km) trail which begins at a parking lot near the hatchery's public toilets. Interpretive signs at the trailhead provide information about the USFWS, and additional signs along the trail inform visitors about local plants and animals. The trail ends at an observation deck which overlooks one of the hatchery's fish ponds. The trail is open year-round.

== See also ==
- National Fish Hatchery System
- List of National Fish Hatcheries in the United States
