= Alchesay =

Alchesay may refer to:

- William Alchesay, a White Mountain Apache Indian chief
- Alchesay Flat, a geographic feature on the Fort Apache Indian Reservation in Navajo County, Arizona
- Alchesay High School, a public high school on the Fort Apache Indian Reservation in Navajo County, Arizona
