= Bozeman National Fish Hatchery =

- U.S. National Register of Historic Places
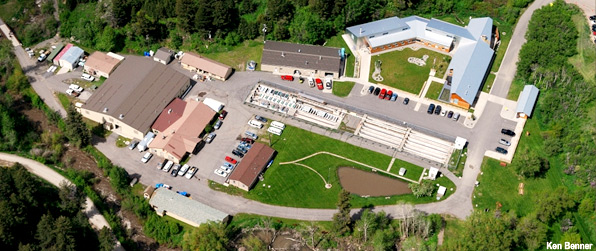
- Aerial view of the Bozeman Fish Technology Center

- Location within Montana Location within the United States
- Location: 4050 Bridger Canyon Rd., Bozeman, Montana
- Coordinates: 45°41′55″N 110°58′41″W
- Area: 0.5 acres (0.20 ha)
- Built: 1896
- Architectural style: Queen Anne, Shingle Style
- Website: http://www.fws.gov/bozemanfishtech/ Bozemand Fish Technology Center
- NRHP reference No.: 83001063
- Added to NRHP: January 6, 1983

The Bozeman National Fish Hatchery, now known as Bozeman Fish Technology Center, is located about 4 miles (6.4 km) northeast of Bozeman, Montana, at the entrance to Bridger Canyon.

Fish Technology Centers work with a wide variety of public and private partners to improve and conserve aquatic resources. Both the Fish Technology Center and the Fish Health Center are part of the National Fish Hatchery System, operated by the United States Fish and Wildlife Service. There are seven Fish Technology Centers and nine Fish Health Centers in the United States. The Bozeman hatchery is the fourth oldest National Fish Hatchery. The hatchery was named to the National Register of Historic Places on January 6, 1983. There is also a National Fish Health Center on the southwest side of Bozeman, near Montana State University, about 7 miles (11 km) away from the Fish Technology Center.

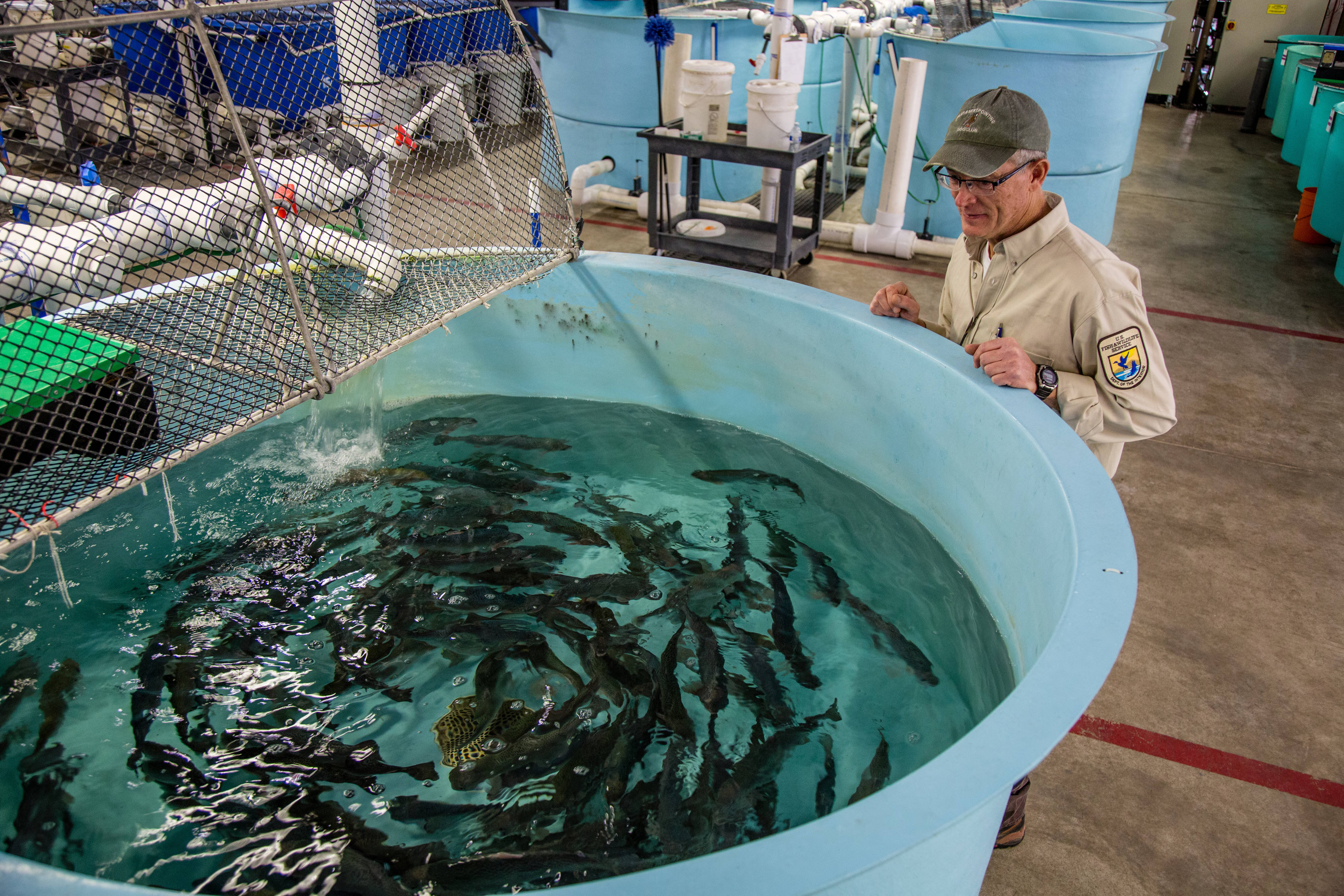
Feeding fish at the Bozeman National Fish Hatchery

The Bozeman National Fish Hatchery was authorized by an act of the United States Congress on August 5, 1892. The initial purchase of land for the hatchery was on May 20, 1893, and consisted of 50.3 acres (20.4 ha) at the entrance to Bridger Canyon. Construction of facilities began April 1895 and was completed in late 1896. The first superintendent, Dr. Chase Tucker, began working there on January 11, 1897. The hatchery's original focus was on brook trout and rainbow trout (steelhead). The hatchery grew steadily and an additional 80 acres (32 ha) were purchased in 1905. The fish hatchery focus ceased in 1966 when the hatchery became a Fish Cultural Development Center with a focus on improving Salmonidae culture. The focus changed again to cover a wider variety of fish species when it became a Fish Technology Center in 1983. Today, the center is more of a research and education center than a hatchery.

A significant accomplishment of the center was its instrumental role in getting the greenback cutthroat trout's rating under the Endangered Species Act changed from extinct to threatened. In August 2004 a new 16,500 square feet (1,530 m^{2}) laboratory and administrative building known as the Robert G. Piper Building was opened, named in honor of a former director of the center. The Bozeman Fish Technology Center currently studies aquatic species culture, aquatic species nutrition, fishery evaluation, and aquatic species health in the states of Montana, North Dakota, South Dakota, Wyoming, Nebraska, Utah, Colorado, and Kansas.

== See also ==
- List of National Fish Hatcheries in the United States
- National Register of Historic Places listings in Gallatin County, Montana
