= Alchesay-Williams Creek National Fish Hatchery Complex =

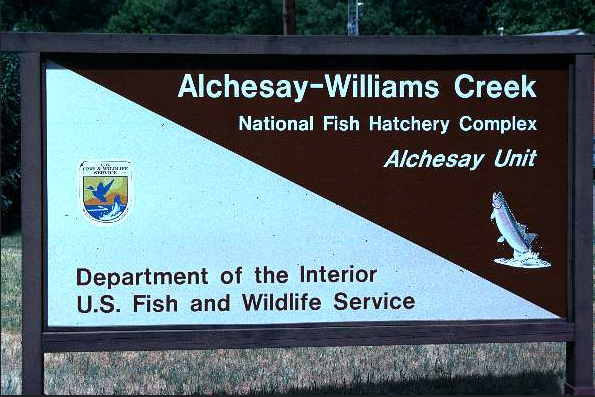
Entrance sign for the Alchesay National Fish Hatchery.

The Alchesay-Williams Creek National Fish Hatchery Complex is a component of the National Fish Hatchery System in the United States. It includes two fish hatcheries in the Fort Apache Indian Reservation in Arizona, the Alchesay National Fish Hatchery, located in Navajo County 9 miles (14 km) north of Whiteriver, and the Williams Creek National Fish Hatchery, which lies about 11 miles (18 km) to the north-northeast in Apache County near McNary. The United States Fish and Wildlife Service operates the complex.

The complex was formed in 1972 to combine the efforts of the two hatcheries to hatch and raise brown trout (Salmo trutta) and rainbow trout (Oncorhynchus mykiss). Eggs of the two species are hatched at the Williams Creek facility, which raises the fingerlings until they reach 3 to 6 inches (7.6 to 15.2 cm) in length. The fingerlings then are transferred to the Alchesay facility, which continues to raise the juvenile fish until they are 6 to 10 inches (15 to 25 cm) long. The fish then are stocked in waters on Native American tribal lands in eastern Arizona and western New Mexico.

In addition, the Williams Creek National Fish Hatchery raises Apache trout (Oncorhynchus apache) and brook trout (Salvelinus fontinalis), which also are stocked in tribal waters in the area.

== See also ==
- National Fish Hatchery System
- List of National Fish Hatcheries in the United States
