= Alchesay National Fish Hatchery =

Fish hatchery in Arizona, United States

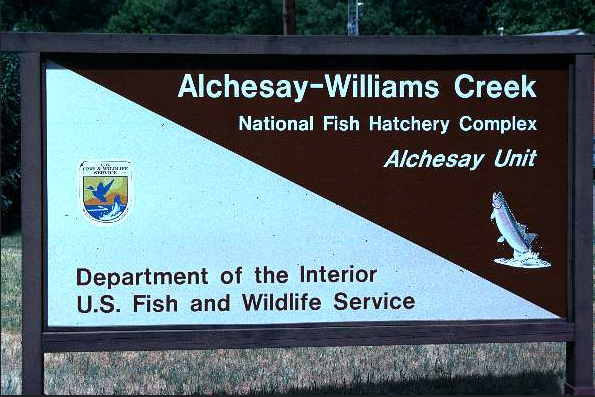

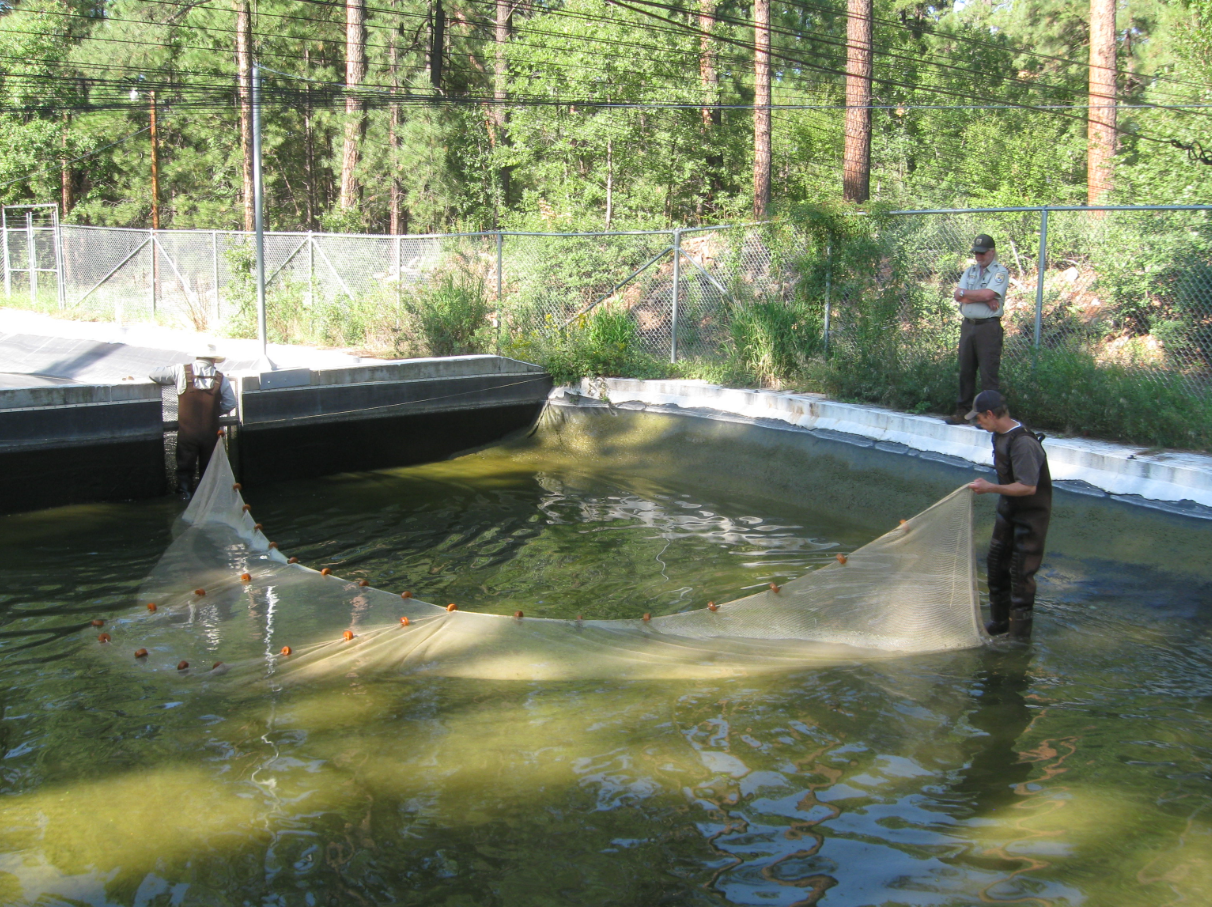
- Seining a fish pond at the Alchesay National Fish Hatchery.

- Location within Arizona Location within the United States
- Location: Navajo County, Arizona, United States
- Coordinates: 33.93434171043103°N 109.92678608996006°W
- Established: 1963
- Named for: Alchesay (1853–1928), a White Mountain Apache chief
- Governing body: United States Fish and Wildlife Service
- Website: www.fws.gov/fish-hatchery/alchesay

The Alchesay National Fish Hatchery is a fish hatchery administered by the United States Fish and Wildlife Service located on the Fort Apache Indian Reservation in Navajo County, Arizona, in the United States, 9 miles (14 km) north of Whiteriver. Like other components of the National Fish Hatchery System, the hatchery's mission is to conserve, protect, and enhance fish, wildlife, plants, and their habitats, as well to cooperate with like-minded partners to further these goals. Its specific purpose is to serve as a "grow-out rearing unit" for brown trout (Salmo trutta) and rainbow trout (Oncorhynchus mykiss) which are stocked in Native American tribal waters in eastern Arizona and western New Mexico.

The hatchery is named for Alchesay (1853–1928), a chief of the White Mountain Apache tribe and United States Army Indian Scout who received the Medal of Honor for his actions during the Indian Wars.

== History ==
In 1959, the United States Fish and Wildlife Service (USFWS) signed a memorandum of understanding with the United States Government's Bureau of Indian Affairs that authorized the establishment of the Alchesay National Fish Hatchery. The creation of the hatchery fulfilled a U.S. Government responsibility for stocking waters on Native American tribal lands in eastern Arizona and western New Mexico. The hatchery began to produce fish in 1963, initially raising brook trout (Salvelinus fontinalis), brown trout (Salmo trutta), and rainbow trout (Oncorhynchus mykiss). It later switched to its focus on brown and rainbow trout. In 1972, operations at the Alchesay National Fish Hatchery were combined with those of the Williams Creek National Fish Hatchery to form the Alchesay-Williams Creek National Fish Hatchery Complex.

== Management ==
The United States Fish and Wildlife Service (USFWS) operates the Alchesay National Fish Hatchery. It is a component of the Alchesay-Williams Creek National Fish Hatchery Complex, which also includes the Williams Creek National Fish Hatchery, located about 11 miles (18 km) to the north-northeast near McNary, Arizona.

== Activities ==
The Alchesay National Fish Hatchery serves as a "grow-out rearing unit" for 3-to-6-inch (7.6 to 15.2 cm) brown trout (Salmo trutta) and rainbow trout (Oncorhynchus mykiss) fingerlings transferred to it from the Williams Creek National Fish Hatchery. Each year, the Alchesay National Fish Hatchery stocks waterways on 17 different Indian reservations and pueblos in eastern Arizona and western New Mexico with about 600,000 of these fish after they reach 6 to 10 inches (15 to 25 cm) in length.

The waters the hatchery stocks lie in the Fort Apache Indian Reservation, the Jicarilla Apache Reservation, the San Carlos Apache Indian Reservation, and Mescalero Apache Reservation, the Acoma Pueblo, the Isleta Pueblo, the Laguna Pueblo, the Nambe Pueblo, the Ohkay Owingeh Pueblo, the Picuris Pueblo, the Sandia Pueblo, the San Ildefonso Pueblo, the Santa Clara Pueblo, the Zia Pueblo, the Zuni Pueblo, the Navajo Nation in both Arizona and New Mexico, and the Hopi Reservation. The yearly production of fish by the two hatcheries represents the largest inland recreational fishing program on Indian trust land in the National Fish Hatchery System. Nonetheless, it usually falls far short of the annual demand for the fish.

== Recreation ==
The Alchesay National Fish Hatchery lies in a picturesque canyon of the North Fork of the White River in the Fort Apache Indian Reservation. Recreational fishing is permitted in the North Fork at the hatchery, including sport fishing for the threatened Apache trout (Oncorhynchus apache).

The hatchery has an on-site sub-catchable and catchable program for both brown and rainbow trout, and hatchery visitors may view both groups of trout. Picnicking, hiking, wildlife observation, and wildlife photography are permitted on the hatchery grounds, where birdwatchers may see bald eagles (Haliaeetus leucocephalus), ospreys (Pandion haliaetus), great blue herons (Ardea herodias), and a wide variety of waterfowl (order Anseriformes).

== See also ==
- National Fish Hatchery System
- List of National Fish Hatcheries in the United States
