= Whiteriver Airport =

Airport in Navajo County, Arizona

Whiteriver Airport Chʼílwozhdi chidí naatʼaʼí ńdinibįįhígi (Navajo)
- IATA: WTR; ICAO: none; FAA LID: E24

Summary
- Airport type: Public
- Owner: White Mountain Apache Tribe
- Serves: Whiteriver, Arizona
- Elevation AMSL: 5,153 ft / 1,571 m
- Coordinates: 33°48′38″N 109°59′09″W

Map

Runways
Direction	Length		Surface
Direction	ft	m	Surface
1/19	6,350	1,935	Asphalt

Statistics (2021)
- Aircraft operations: 3,910
- Source: Federal Aviation Administration

Whiteriver Airport (IATA: WTR, FAA LID: E24) is a public use airport located 1 mile (0.87 nmi; 1.6 km) southwest of the central business district of Whiteriver, in Navajo County, Arizona, United States. It is owned by the White Mountain Apache Tribe. This airport is included in the National Plan of Integrated Airport Systems, which categorized it as a general aviation facility.

== Facilities and aircraft ==
Whiteriver Airport covers an area of 112 acres (45 ha) at an elevation of 5,153 feet (1,571 m) above mean sea level. It has one runway designated 1/19 with an asphalt surface measuring 6,350 by 75 feet (1,935 x 23 m).

For the 12-month period ending April 8, 2021, the airport had 3,910 aircraft operations, an average of 75 per week: 99% general aviation and 2% military.

== See also ==
- List of airports in Arizona
