= White Sulphur Springs National Fish Hatchery =

Coordinates: 37.80009°N 80.29462°W

White Sulphur Springs National Fish Hatchery is a U.S. Fish and Wildlife Service facility located along the historic Midland Trail in the Allegheny Highlands of southeast West Virginia. Established in 1900 or 1902 to produce fish for the American public, the fish hatchery became part of the National Broodstock Program in 1976. In 1995, a freshwater mussel conservation program was added.

The hatchery's mission is to provide recreational fishing, and recovers fish, mussels, and other wildlife. It aims to promote the appreciation of natural resources. It ships millions of rainbow trout eggs to hatcheries across the United States every year. Surplus rainbow trout are released into West Virginia waterways.

In 2016, Greenbrier County, West Virginia was affected by flooding, including the hatchery. 15,000 adult rainbow trout brood stock were lost and it took two years for the facility to recover.

== Freshwater Mussel Conservation ==
Added to the hatchery in 1995, this program works toward the restoration of freshwater mussel populations. In 2013, White Sulphur Springs – along with the Columbus Zoo and Aquarium Freshwater Mussel Conservation and Research Center, and the Center for Mollusk Conservation in Frankfort, Kentucky – began work to restore the endangered purple cat’s paw pearlymussel. The species previously inhabited the Ohio River and many of the larger tributaries. Identified as an endangered species in July 1990, the populations steeply declined due to the damning of the Ohio River, dredging, the dumping of industrial waste, and competition from the invasive zebra mussel.

== Freshwater Folk Festival ==
The Freshwater Folk Festival is hosted by the Friends of the White Sulphur Springs National Fish Hatchery in the Fall every year. The event was first held on October 2, 2004. It's designed to be a family-friendly day of music, food, crafts, and educational opportunities.

== Annual Fishing Derby ==
The White Sulphur Springs Annual Fishing Derby is held on the Saturday of Memorial Day weekend, meant to provide families with the opportunity to spend the day fishing for rainbow trout. The Annual Fishing Derby has been celebrated for over 20 years; it is co-hosted by the White Sulphur Springs Rotary Club.
