= White River National Fish Hatchery =

American fish production facility

Coordinates: 43.81049°N 72.65831°W

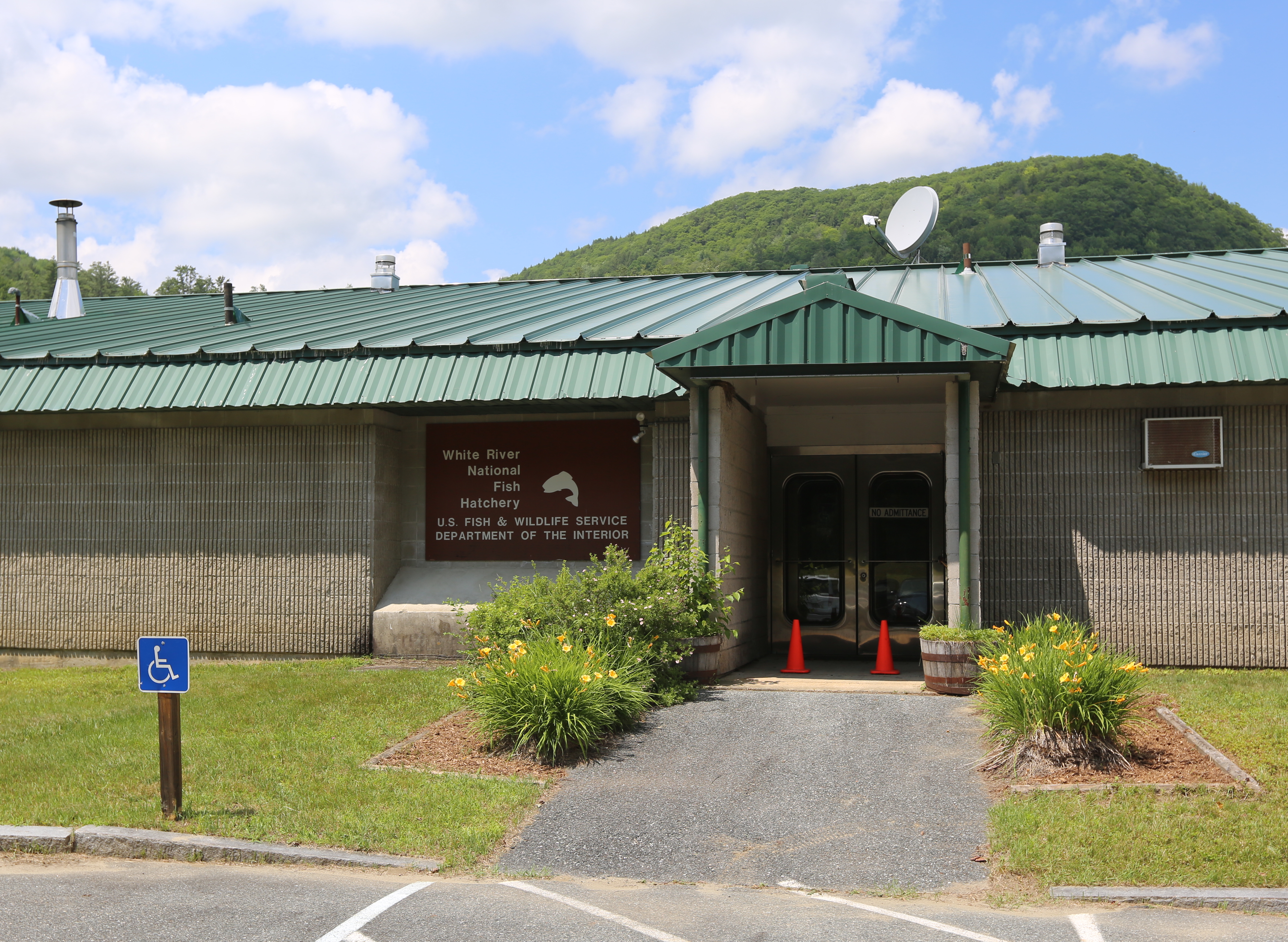
- Front view of the White River National Fish Hatchery.
- Interactive map of the White River National Fish Hatchery area

General information
- Location: 2086 River Street, Bethel, Vermont
- Inaugurated: 1984
- Renovated: 2012

Website
- http://www.fws.gov/whiterivernfh/

The White River National Fish Hatchery is a U.S. Fish and Wildlife Service coldwater fish production facility located near Bethel, Vermont. Hatchery staff works to support both the Connecticut River Atlantic Salmon Restoration Program (since 1978) and the Lower Great Lakes Lake Trout Restoration Program. The White River National Fish Hatchery is one of four offices in the Western New England Complex.

== Western New England Complex ==
The four offices of the Western New England Complex—Berkshire National Fish Hatchery, Dwight D. Eisenhower National Fish Hatchery, White River National Fish Hatchery and Lake Champlain Fish and Wildlife Resource Complex—work in concert to produce and manage fishery resources for restoration efforts in the Connecticut River and Lake Champlain. In addition, habitat conservation and restoration efforts are enacted throughout the four primary watersheds of Western New England to support fish and wildlife resources. This integrated approach to species and habitat management helps promote their goal of ecosystem conservation and restoration while providing recreational opportunities for the public.

== Mission ==
The mission of the hatchery was to produce and release Atlantic salmon fry in tributaries throughout the Connecticut River watershed. The hatchery previously supplied over 650,000 lake trout yearlings for stocking Lake Erie and Lake Ontario.

== Flood ==
The hatchery was damaged during Tropical Storm Irene in 2011. As a result, it was decommissioned for a period of years while undergoing $2.3 million in repairs. It reopened in July 2017.
