= Whiteriver, Arizona =

Census-designated place in Navajo County, Arizona, United States

- Census designated place
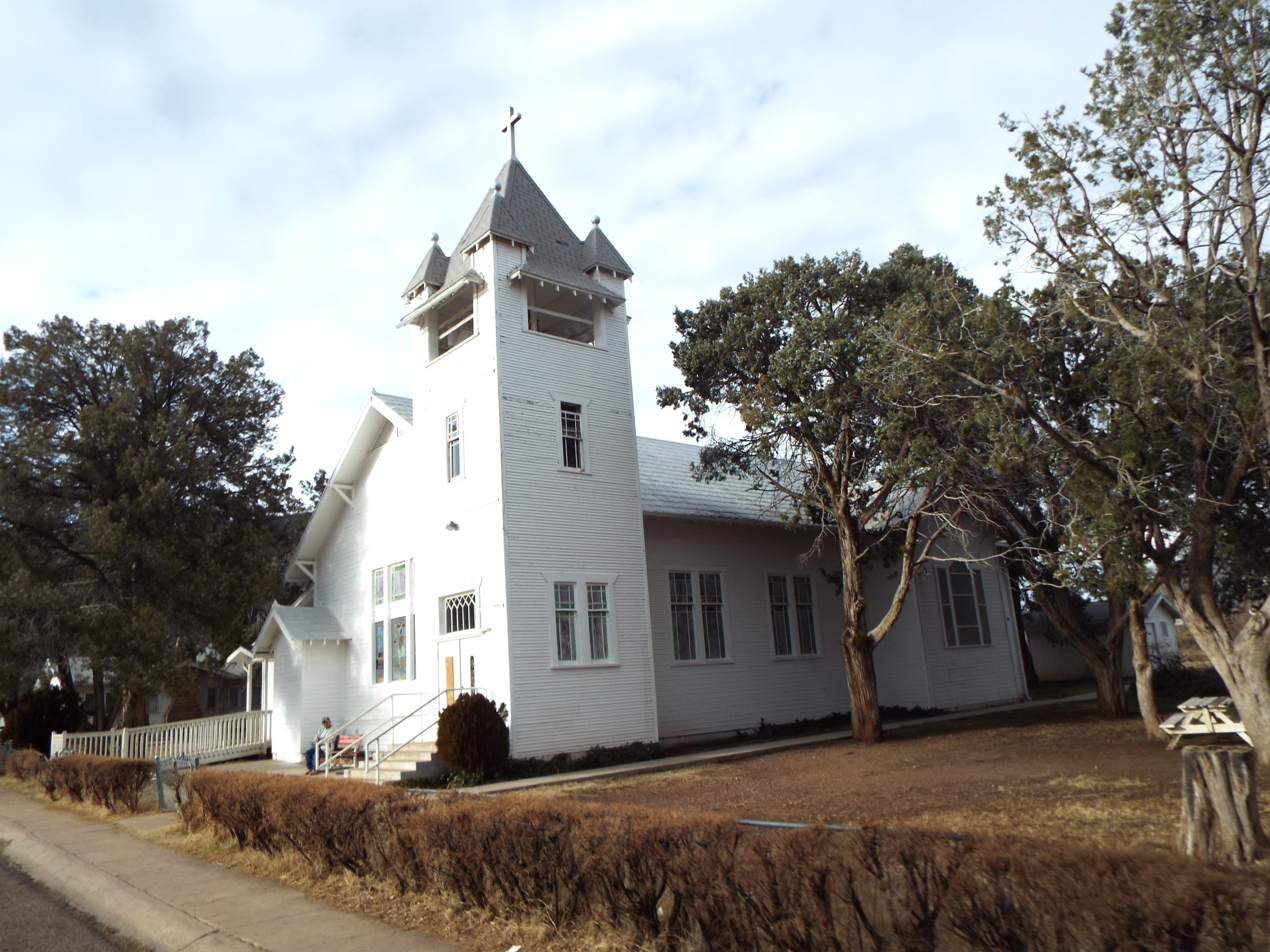
- Historic Lutheran Apache Mission

- Location in Navajo County and the state of Arizona

- Location in the United States
- Coordinates: 33°49′59″N 109°58′28″W
- Country: United States
- State: Arizona
- County: Navajo

Area
  - Total: 15.80 sq mi (40.91 km^{2})
  - Land: 15.69 sq mi (40.63 km^{2})
  - Water: 0.11 sq mi (0.28 km^{2})
- Elevation: 5,164 ft (1,574 m)

Population (2020)
  - Total: 4,520
  - Density: 288.1/sq mi (111.25/km^{2})
- Time zone: UTC−7 (MST)
- ZIP code: 85941
- Area code: 928
- FIPS code: 04-82530
- GNIS ID(s): 2409588

Whiteriver (Western Apache: Chʼilwózh) is a census-designated place (CDP) on the Fort Apache Indian Reservation in Navajo County, Arizona, United States. The population was 4,104 at the 2010 census, making it the largest settlement on the reservation.

== Geography ==
According to the United States Census Bureau, the CDP has a total area of 17.8 square miles (46 km^{2}), all land.

== Demographics ==
Historical population
Census	Pop.	Note	%±
1980	2,257		—
1990	3,775		67.3%
2000	5,220		38.3%
2010	4,104		−21.4%
2020	4,520		10.1%

=== 2020 census ===
As of the 2020 census, Whiteriver had a population of 4,520. The median age was 27.1 years. 36.6% of residents were under the age of 18 and 7.3% of residents were 65 years of age or older. For every 100 females there were 93.3 males, and for every 100 females age 18 and over there were 90.4 males age 18 and over.

0.0% of residents lived in urban areas, while 100.0% lived in rural areas.

There were 1,097 households in Whiteriver, of which 58.9% had children under the age of 18 living in them. Of all households, 32.5% were married-couple households, 19.6% were households with a male householder and no spouse or partner present, and 35.9% were households with a female householder and no spouse or partner present. About 17.6% of all households were made up of individuals and 3.7% had someone living alone who was 65 years of age or older.

There were 1,182 housing units, of which 7.2% were vacant. The homeowner vacancy rate was 0.0% and the rental vacancy rate was 1.5%.

Racial composition as of the 2020 census
Race	Number	Percent
White	21	0.5%
Black or African American	4	0.1%
American Indian and Alaska Native	4,435	98.1%
Asian	11	0.2%
Native Hawaiian and Other Pacific Islander	0	0.0%
Some other race	4	0.1%
Two or more races	45	1.0%
Hispanic or Latino (of any race)	27	0.6%

=== 2000 census ===
As of the 2000 United States census, there were 5,220 people, 1,249 households, and 1,054 families residing in the CDP. The population density was 293.0 inhabitants per square mile (113.1/km^{2}). There were 1,330 housing units at an average density of 74.6 per square mile (28.8/km^{2}). The racial makeup of the CDP was 95.1% Native American, 3.0% White, <0.1% Black or African American, <0.1% Asian, 0.3% from other races, and 1.5% from two or more races. 1.9% of the population were Hispanic or Latino of any race.

There were 1,249 households, out of which 56.4% had children under the age of 18 living with them, 43.1% were married couples living together, 34.3% had a female householder with no husband present, and 15.6% were non-families. 12.8% of all households were made up of individuals, and 1.3% had someone living alone who was 65 years of age or older. The average household size was 4.10 and the average family size was 4.45.

In the CDP, the population was spread out, with 44.4% under the age of 18, 10.6% from 18 to 24, 28.6% from 25 to 44, 13.3% from 45 to 64, and 3.2% who were 65 years of age or older. The median age was 21 years. For every 100 females, there were 91.7 males. For every 100 females age 18 and over, there were 89.5 males.

The median income for a household in the CDP was $17,415, and the median income for a family was $17,774. Males had a median income of $18,490 versus $20,463 for females. The per capita income for the CDP was $5,719. About 46.9% of families and 51.6% of the population were below the poverty line, including 59.2% of those under age 18 and 35.2% of those age 65 or over.

== Religion ==
As of 2005, the Apache Reservation in which Whiteriver is located showed a decrease from 73% traditional or atheist to 43%. The percent of the population who consider themselves Christian was then 53%.

== Transportation ==
Whiteriver Airport is a public use general aviation airport located one nautical mile (2 km) southwest of the central business district of Whiteriver.

The White Mountain Apache Tribe operates the Fort Apache Connection Transit, which provides local bus service.

== Education ==
Whiteriver is served by the Whiteriver Unified School District.

Alchesay High School is the secondary school of Whiteriver.

East Fork Lutheran School is a Christian grade school and high school of the Wisconsin Evangelical Lutheran Synod in Whiteriver. It has repeatedly disciplined and even expelled students who participate in Apache cultural traditions, considering them as Satanism or paganism.

== Climate ==
Whiteriver has a Mediterranean climate (Köppen Csa/Csb) with summers featuring hot afternoons and mild mornings, and winters featuring comfortable afternoons and freezing mornings. Unlike most climates of its type, the summer drought only covers the first half of the hot season – monsoonal rains arrive in July and peak in August before falling off in September. During the dry early summer wildfires are however always a risk. The typical winter weather of mild days and freezing nights is sometimes interrupted by heavy rainfall or snowfall from Pacific storms, which bring an average of between 1.5 and 2 inches (38.1 and 50.8 mm) of precipitation each month, and a mean of 16.5 inches or 0.42 metres of snow – although the median annual snowfall is only 6.3 inches or 0.16 metres.

Climate data for Whiteriver, Arizona
Month	Jan	Feb	Mar	Apr	May	Jun	Jul	Aug	Sep	Oct	Nov	Dec	Year
Record high °F (°C)	75 (24)	78 (26)	86 (30)	98 (37)	100 (38)	104 (40)	106 (41)	102 (39)	100 (38)	93 (34)	91 (33)	79 (26)	106 (41)
Mean daily maximum °F (°C)	55.2 (12.9)	58.2 (14.6)	62.3 (16.8)	69.6 (20.9)	77.9 (25.5)	87.7 (30.9)	89.8 (32.1)	87.1 (30.6)	83.8 (28.8)	74.3 (23.5)	63.3 (17.4)	55.8 (13.2)	72.1 (22.3)
Mean daily minimum °F (°C)	24.6 (−4.1)	27.1 (−2.7)	31.0 (−0.6)	33.0 (0.6)	39.4 (4.1)	48.0 (8.9)	55.0 (12.8)	54.5 (12.5)	49.2 (9.6)	38.9 (3.8)	29.3 (−1.5)	24.5 (−4.2)	37.9 (3.3)
Record low °F (°C)	−13 (−25)	−6 (−21)	5 (−15)	14 (−10)	18 (−8)	30 (−1)	41 (5)	34 (1)	25 (−4)	17 (−8)	−7 (−22)	−12 (−24)	−13 (−25)
Average precipitation inches (mm)	1.80 (46)	1.59 (40)	2.16 (55)	0.82 (21)	0.62 (16)	0.58 (15)	2.44 (62)	3.62 (92)	1.75 (44)	1.83 (46)	1.48 (38)	1.45 (37)	20.14 (512)
Average snowfall inches (cm)	4.6 (12)	2.1 (5.3)	4.9 (12)	1.6 (4.1)	0.1 (0.25)	0.0 (0.0)	0.0 (0.0)	0.0 (0.0)	0.0 (0.0)	0.1 (0.25)	1.7 (4.3)	1.4 (3.6)	16.5 (41.8)
Average precipitation days (≥ 0.01 inch)	6.2	5.6	6.7	3.8	3.7	3.0	9.4	11.4	5.5	4.6	3.9	4.4	68.2
Average snowy days (≥ 0.1 inch)	1.4	1.4	1.6	0.8	0.1	0.0	0.0	0.0	0.0	0.0	0.4	0.7	6.4
Source: NOAA

== See also ==
- List of census-designated places in Arizona
- Bashas
