= National Fish Hatchery System =

System of fish hatcheries in the United States

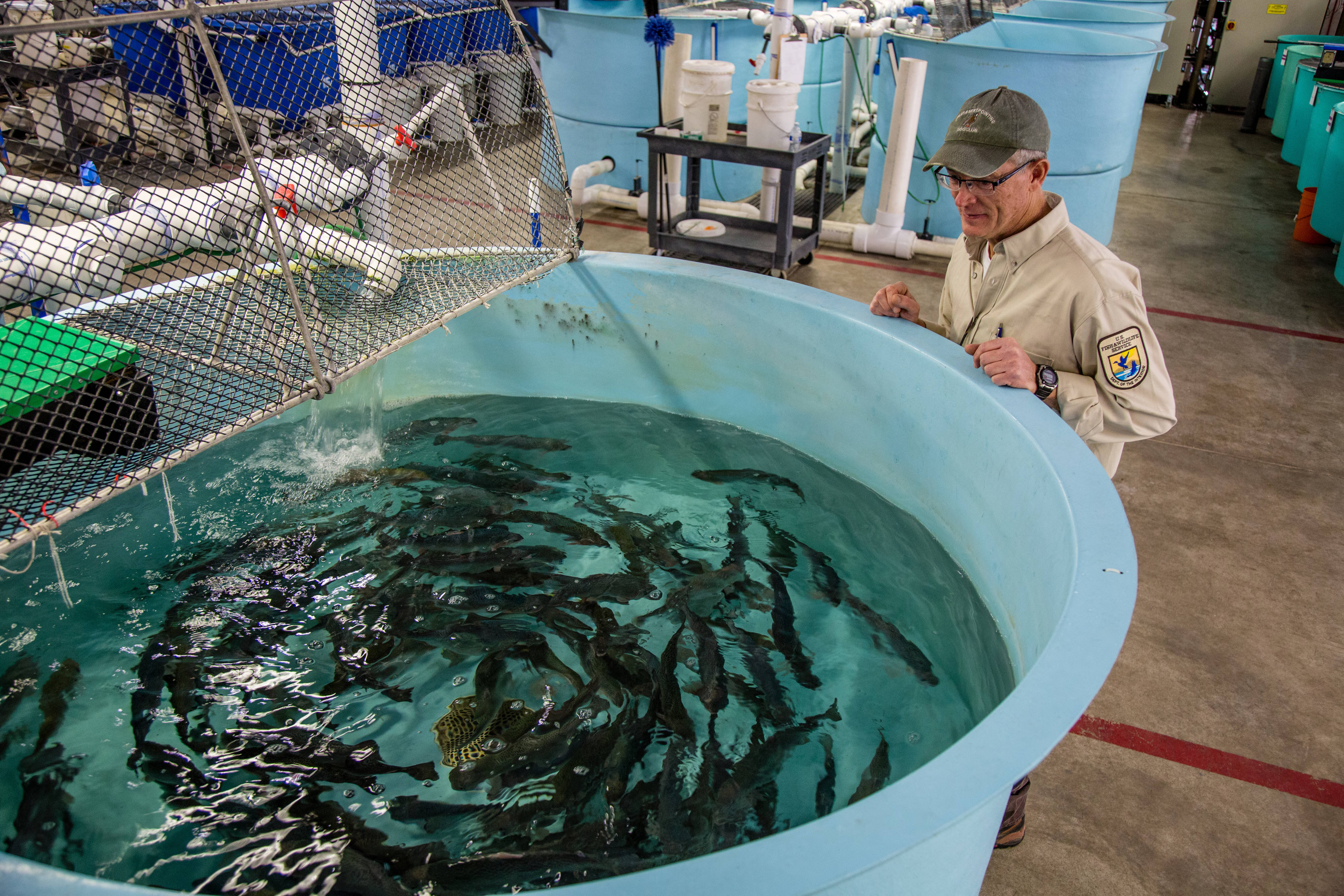
Bozeman National Fish Hatchery

The National Fish Hatchery System was established in 1871 when the United States Congress created the United States Fish Commission. Since 1940, the United States Fish and Wildlife Service has administered this system of fish hatcheries under the Department of the Interior.

== History ==
When early pioneers began migrating to the western United States, there were no catch limits on fish and no laws preventing people from modifying fish habitats to meet human needs for water, food, and safety. As settlement progressed, abundant fish populations began to decline. By 1870, growing concern for such declines prompted fishery studies, which spurred the establishment of fish spawning stations for collecting and hatching fish eggs and stocking small fish back into waters with declining fisheries. Many of these early spawning stations later became fish hatcheries, marking the beginning of the Fisheries Program and the NFHS.

President Ulysses S. Grant was chiefly responsible for the first official government action to conserve U.S. fishery resources for future generations. President Grant established the United States Fish Commission in 1871. The Commission was a forerunner of the U.S. Fish and Wildlife Service and the Fisheries Program.

In 1872, the first federal fish hatchery, known as the Baird Hatchery, was established on the McCloud River in California. The NFHS has since grown into a large complex system devoted to conserving U.S. fishery resources.

Originally Spencer Fullerton Baird was chosen by President Ulysses S. Grant to manage the fisheries in the country. He was named "Commissioner of Fish and Fisheries". In 1871 Baird took office but his work was still in effect. The people were now understanding the importance of the fisheries, for sport and food. With much pressure from such organizations as the American Fish Cultural Association and the American Fisheries Society, Congress reserved $15,000 for the fisheries.

The man that was chosen to essentially take Baird's position was Livingston Stone. With a group of scientists, his job was to find salmon spawning areas and develop a salmon hatchery so that the eggs could be managed and shipped around the country to make the salmon available for all. Stone and his team located this area and started shipping eggs as soon as possible. A few miles from where they had originally found the salmon eggs, rainbow trout eggs were also found. Now rainbow trout eggs and salmon eggs were being shipped across the world. Essentially every rainbow trout's native water is northern California. The Baird Hatchery was formed from Stone and today the hatchery still manages fish as they did back in the 1800s.

== The Fisheries Program ==
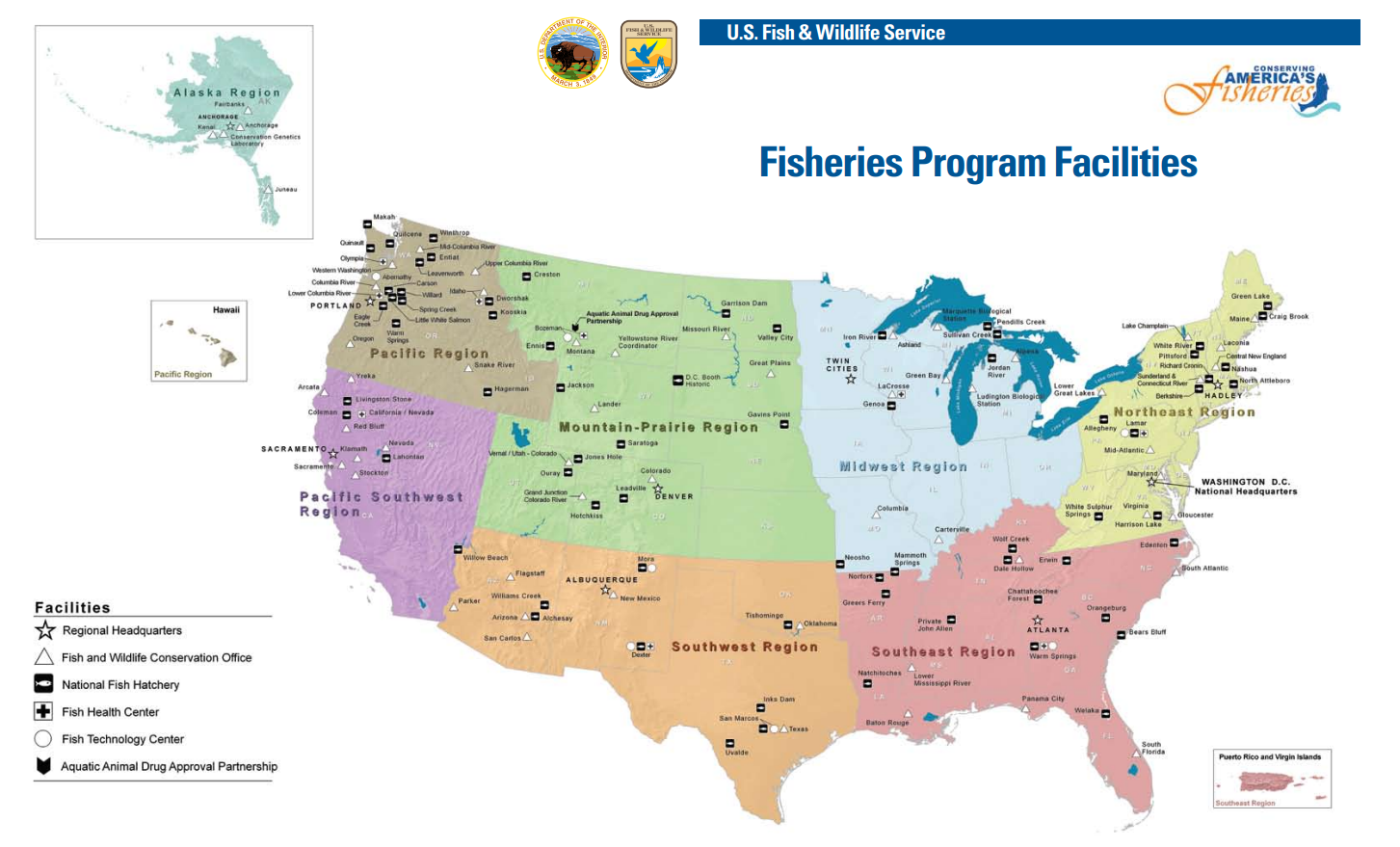
A 2009 map of the United States Fish and Wildlife Service's Fisheries Program facilities, including the national fish hatcheries.

The Service's Fisheries Program and its fish hatchery system have played a vital role in conserving America's fishery resources for over 130 years. The program was established mainly to address the following:

- The growing concern over the observed decline in the United States' fishery resources;
- the lack of information concerning the status of the Nation's fisheries; and
- the need to define and protect U.S. fishing rights.

The Fisheries Program has worked with valued partners including States, Native American tribes, Federal Agencies, other Service programs, and private interests in a larger effort to conserve fish and other aquatic resources.

== Responsibilities ==
The original purpose of the NFHS was to supplement declining native stocks of coastal and lake food fish through fish propagation. The NFHS has extensive experience culturing over 100 different aquatic species, and now propagates fish for reasons beyond supplementing declining food species. Hatchery-reared fish are now used to replace fish that were lost from natural events including drought, flood, habitat destruction, or human influences such as over-harvest, pollution, habitat loss due to development and dam construction. This is necessary in order to establish fish populations that meet specific management needs, and to provide for the creation of new and expanded recreational fisheries opportunities.

The role of the NFHS has changed significantly over the past 30 years as a result of the increasing demands recently placed upon various aquatic systems. Major responsibilities of the NFHS, besides mentioned fish propagation, now include helping to recover species listed under the Endangered Species Act, restoring native aquatic populations, mitigating for fisheries lost as a result of federal water projects, and providing fish to benefit Indian tribes and National Wildlife Refuges. NFHS concentrates its efforts on several fish species including lake trout, rainbow trout, cutthroat trout, paddlefish, and sturgeon. Other interesting species that the NFHS helps to restore include freshwater mussels and amphibians.

== Conservation ==
The NFHS is able to conserve U.S. fishery resources by:

- preserving the genes of wild and hatchery-raised fish;
- restoring fish populations that have declined;
- protecting threatened and endangered fish and restoring them to their native waters;
- providing fish health services;
- providing Native American tribes with native and recreation fisheries;
- making up for the loss of fish as a result of Federal water projects, such as canals and dams; and
- serving as education, outreach, and research stations

== Achievements ==
In 2024, the National Fish Hatchery System, consisting of 71 national fish hatcheries, nine fish health centers, and seven fish technology centers across 35 states, played a significant role in conservation efforts. They distributed a total of 223 million fish and aquatic wildlife, representing over 60 different species. This effort has supported various restoration programs, including those focused on Great Lakes lake trout, Atlantic Coast striped bass, Atlantic salmon, and Pacific salmon.
