= Private John Allen =

Private John Allen may refer to:

- John Mills Allen (1846–1917), an American politician from Mississippi who referred to himself as "Private John Allen"
- Private John Allen National Fish Hatchery, a fish hatchery and park in Mississippi in the United States
