= Private John Allen National Fish Hatchery =

Fish hatchery in Mississippi, United States

Private John Allen National Fish Hatchery (ex-Tupelo National Fish Hatchery)
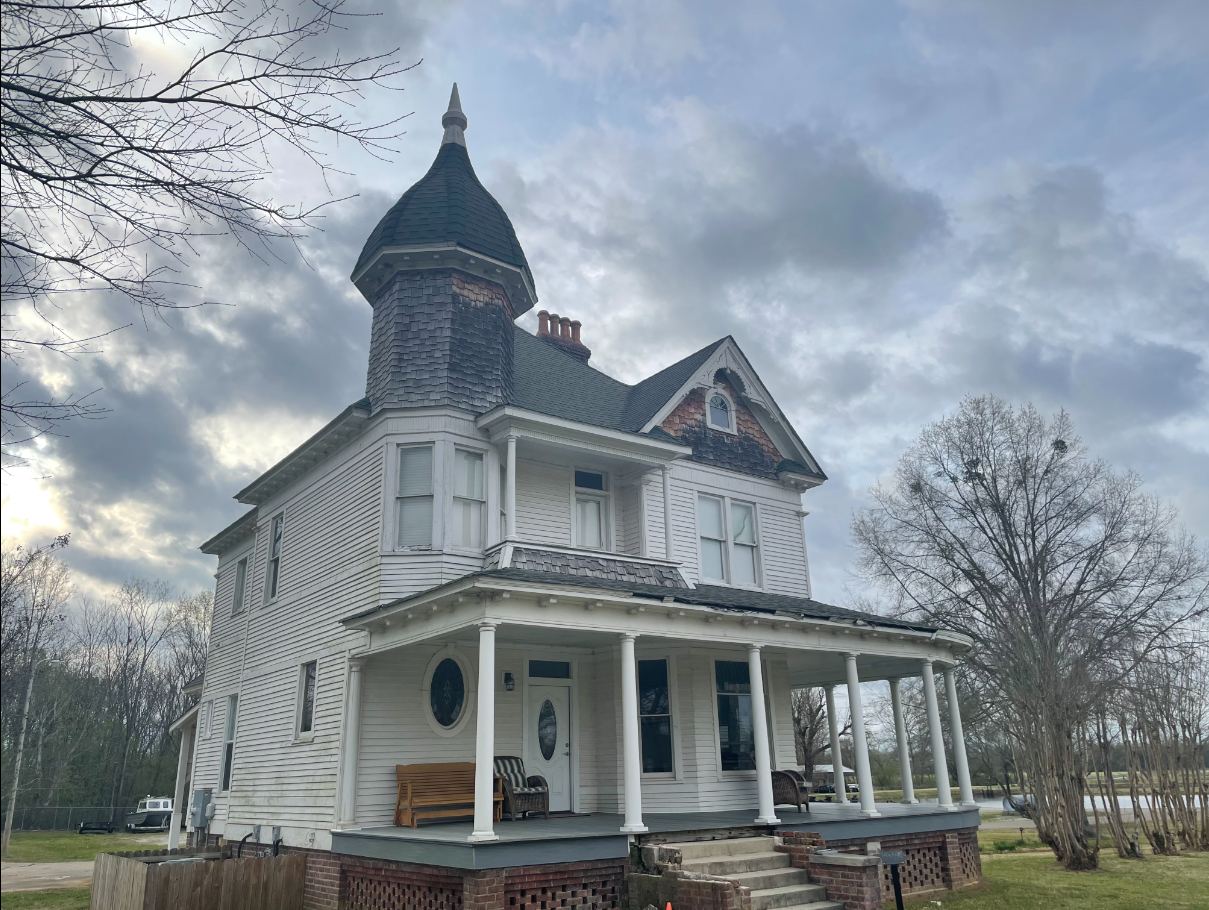
- The Old Superintendent's House at the Private John Allen Lake National Fish Hatchery

- Location within Mississippi Location within the United States
- Location: Tupelo, Mississippi, United States
- Coordinates: 34.24934045100797°N 88.70280682221626°W
- Area: 28 acres (11 ha)
- Established: 1901; Opened 1904
- Named for: Tupelo, Mississippi (1901–1982); John Mills "Private John" Allen (1982–present)
- Visitors: 20,000 per year (2024)
- Governing body: United States Fish and Wildlife Service
- Website: www.fws.gov/fish-hatchery/private-john-allen

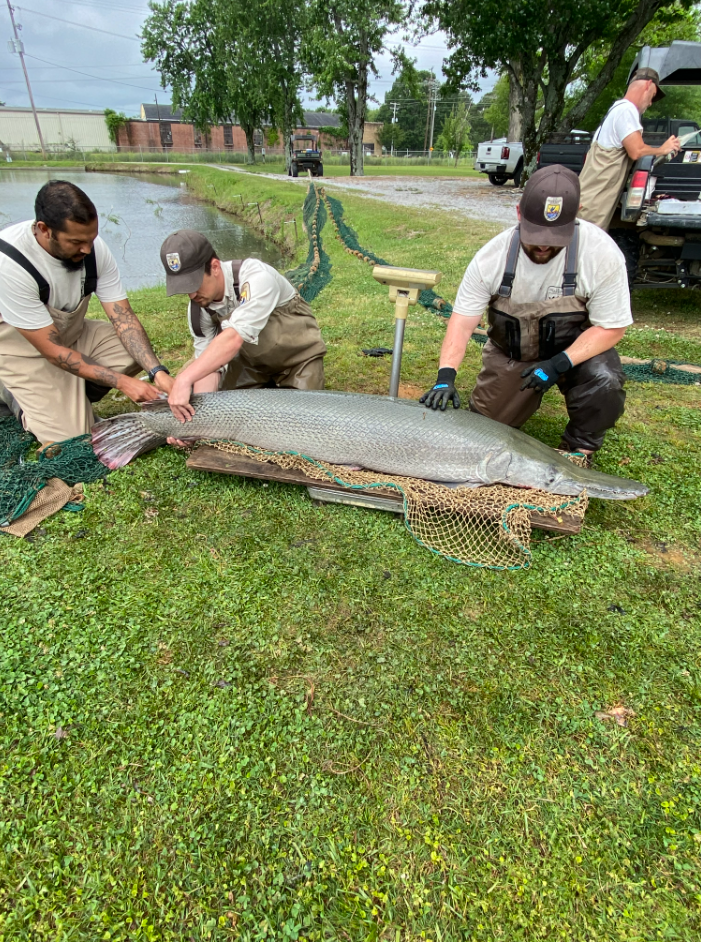
Hatchery employees inject an alligator gar (Atractosteus spatula) with luteinizing hormone-releasing hormone analogue (LHRHa).

The Private John Allen National Fish Hatchery, known until 1982 as the Tupelo National Fish Hatchery, is a fish hatchery in Tupelo, Mississippi, in the United States. It is managed and operated by the United States Fish and Wildlife Service (USFWS). Like other components of the National Fish Hatchery System, the hatchery's mission is to conserve, protect, and enhance fish, wildlife, plants, and their habitats, as well to cooperate with like-minded partners to further these goals. As of 2025, the hatchery produces 12 different species. It also plays a nationwide role in leading the USFWS's Aquatic Habitat Restoration Team.

== Management ==
The Private John Allen National Fish Hatchery is managed and operated by the United States Fish and Wildlife Service.

== Facilities ==
As of 2024, the Private John Allen National Fish Hatchery includes grounds covering 28 acres (11 hectares) and has 16 earthen fish ponds. Structures on the grounds include the hatchery's office building – which serves as its administrative center and headquarters — a fish holding house, a feed storage house, maintenance garages, a paint and oil house, and a pump house which is the hatchery's source of water. The Old Superintendent's House, in which the hatchery manager resided until the 1980s and which later was renovated to provide office and dormitory space, also lies on the grounds and is on the National Register of Historic Places.

== Activities ==
=== Fish production ===
The Private John Allen National Fish Hatchery is considered a "warm-water hatchery" because the species of fish it raises in its ponds have their optimal growth rate in summer water temperatures of 75 to 85 °F (24 to 29 °C). Three artesian springs provide it with its water at a temperature of about 65 °F (18 °C) year-round, allowing it also to propagate lake sturgeon (Huso fulvescens), which thrive in cooler water, in its fish holding house.

As of 2025, the hatchery produces 12 species which either are important in recreational fishing or are threatened or endangered. The hatchery propagates alligator gar (Atractosteus spatula) and lake sturgeon to restore and maintain populations of those species, and its work with alligator gar gives it an important role in the production, rearing, shipping, and stocking of all life stages of that species across the southeastern United States. It supports recreational fishing by producing bluegill (Lepomis macrochirus), largemouth bass (Micropterus nigricans), and redear sunfish (Lepomis microlophus) to stock in waterways in national forests and the National Wildlife Refuge System, by maintaining a healthy broodstock of the Gulf Coast strain of walleye (Sander vitreus), and by propagating channel catfish (Ictalurus punctatus). It also develops propagation protocols for the frecklebelly madtom (Noturus munitus), pearl darter (Percina aurora), piebald madtom (Noturus gladiator) and Yoknapatawpha darter (Etheostoma faulkneri). On a continuous basis, it develops, modifies, and researches the most effective and efficient methods to spawn, produce, rear, raise, release, monitor, and assess the species it produces. Most of the fish it produces are stocked annually in reservoirs, lakes, rivers, and creeks across the southeastern United States.

The hatchery also leads the U.S. Fish and Wildlife Service's Aquatic Habitat Restoration Team. In this role, members of the hatchery's staff travel across the United States to modify aquatic habitats to benefit native species, as well as to remove dams, install bottomless concrete or aluminium culverts, and take other measures to restore the access of native species to the country's waterways.

=== Education and outreach ===
The hatchery's staff operates an elaborate mobile public aquarium which visits local schools and conservation organizations to serve as an outdoor classroom. As many as 5,000 schoolchildren have viewed the mobile aquarium in a single weekend and as many as 35,000 in a single summer. The hatchery also hosts annual events during National Fishing Week, Earth Day, and several local festivals that take place throughout the year.

== History ==
John Mills Allen (1846–1917) served in the Confederate States Army as a private during the American Civil War (1861–1865), represented Mississippi's 1st District in the United States House of Representatives from 1885 to 1901, and called himself "Private John" Allen – in reference to his military service – as a gesture of humility. He became known during his time in the United States Congress for the entertaining, tongue-in-cheek style in which he delivered speeches on serious subjects. He advocated the construction of a national fish hatchery in Tupelo, and on February 20, 1901, delivered his eloquent "Fish Hatchery Speech" before the House of Representatives calling for the establishment of the hatchery and stating with mock seriousness that "Fish will travel overland for miles to get into the water we have at Tupelo. . .thousands and millions of unborn fish are clamoring to this Congress today for an opportunity to be hatched at the Tupelo hatchery." (Note: John Mills Allen's "Fish Hatchery Speech" was reprinted in its entirety on Pages 2510 through 2512 of the Congressional Record of March 7,1940) The speech has been described as "the most spontaneous burst of wit and humor ever heard on the floors of Congress."

Shortly after Allen's speech, Congress passed legislation approving the construction of the Tupelo National Fish Hatchery, and President William McKinley signed the legislation establishing it later in 1901. After construction of its facilities – which initially consisted of five earthen fish ponds fed by three artesian springs – it began the production of fish in 1904. The two-story Queen Anne Revival-style hatchery manager's house was constructed on the hatchery grounds in 1904 and served as the residence for the hatchery manager. Much of Tupelo's social life during the early 1900s centered around the house.

Sources give somewhat different accounts of the Tupelo National Fish Hatchery's early years: One states that in the early 1900s it served as a subsistence fishery to meet a growing demand for food across the United States, while another asserts that it initially focused on the support of recreational fishing by producing bluegill, channel catfish, largemouth bass, and redear sunfish (Lepomis microlophus) for stocking in the waters of Mississippi and contiguous states. In its early years, the hatchery shipped fish it produced in railroad cars, which reached the hatchery via railroads which flanked it along its eastern and western boundaries.

In 1982, the hatchery was renamed the Private John Allen National Fish Hatchery in honor of John Mills Allen. In the 1980s it partnered with the United States Department of Agriculture (USDA) in the Farm Pond Program, in which the USDA assisted private landowners in constructing ponds on their property and the hatchery provided channel catfish (Ictalurus punctatus) fingerlings to private landowners to stock their newly constructed ponds.

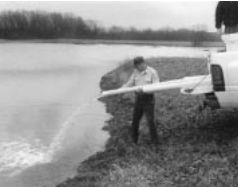
A hatchery employee stocks bass at the Hatchie National Wildlife Refuge in Tennessee sometime prior to 2002.

With the end of the Farm Pond Program in 1989, the hatchery refocused its work on the propagation of fish for stocking in public waters and the rearing of threatened and endangered species for the restoration and preservation of their populations. In the mid-1990s the hatchery became involved in the propagation and stocking of alligator gar.

By 2001, the hatchery produced 5 million fish annually in its 15 fish ponds. Of these, 500,000 were striped bass, which the hatchery produced as part of a major national program to restore and maintain populations of the species. At the time, the hatchery also was one of the primary American paddlefish (Polyodon spathula) restoration sites in the southeastern United States, collecting paddlefish from Mississippi and surrounding states, artificially spawning them by removing eggs from females surgically, and feeding the young paddlefish natural foods harvested from its ponds until releasing them in the wild 90 days after they hatched. The hatchery tagged some of the paddlefish before releasing them, allowing biologists to better understand the life history of tagged fish that are caught later. As of 2001, the hatchery also took part in a program to restore and maintain populations of freshwater mussels by producing host fish which it shipped to the Mammoth Spring National Fish Hatchery in Arkansas, where the staff infested the fish with glochidia, a parasitic larval stage of the lifecycle of the mussels, as part of ongoing research into freshwater mussel propagation at the Mammoth Spring hatchery.

In 2002, the hatchery described its facilities as including 13 earthen fish ponds, two lined fish ponds, an in-ground raceway system, and a fish holding house/intensive culture building. As of that year, the hatchery continued to raise and stock species important in recreational fishing. It stocked striped bass in the waters of Alabama, Florida, Georgia, Louisiana, and Mississippi; produced walleye to mitigate the population loss of that species in the drainage basin of the White River in Arkansas and Missouri, and assisted in efforts to restore populations of endangered species such as the alligator gar, American paddlefish, and lake sturgeon. In addition, it worked with fisheries resource offices to survey populations of Gulf sturgeon (Acipenser desotoi), carry out product evaluations of the Gulf Coast strain of striped bass, and conduct sampling of the endangered Alabama sturgeon (Scaphirhynchus suttkusi). It also operated its mobile aquarium in its outreach program by 2002. The hatchery had about 50,000 visitors annually as of 2002.

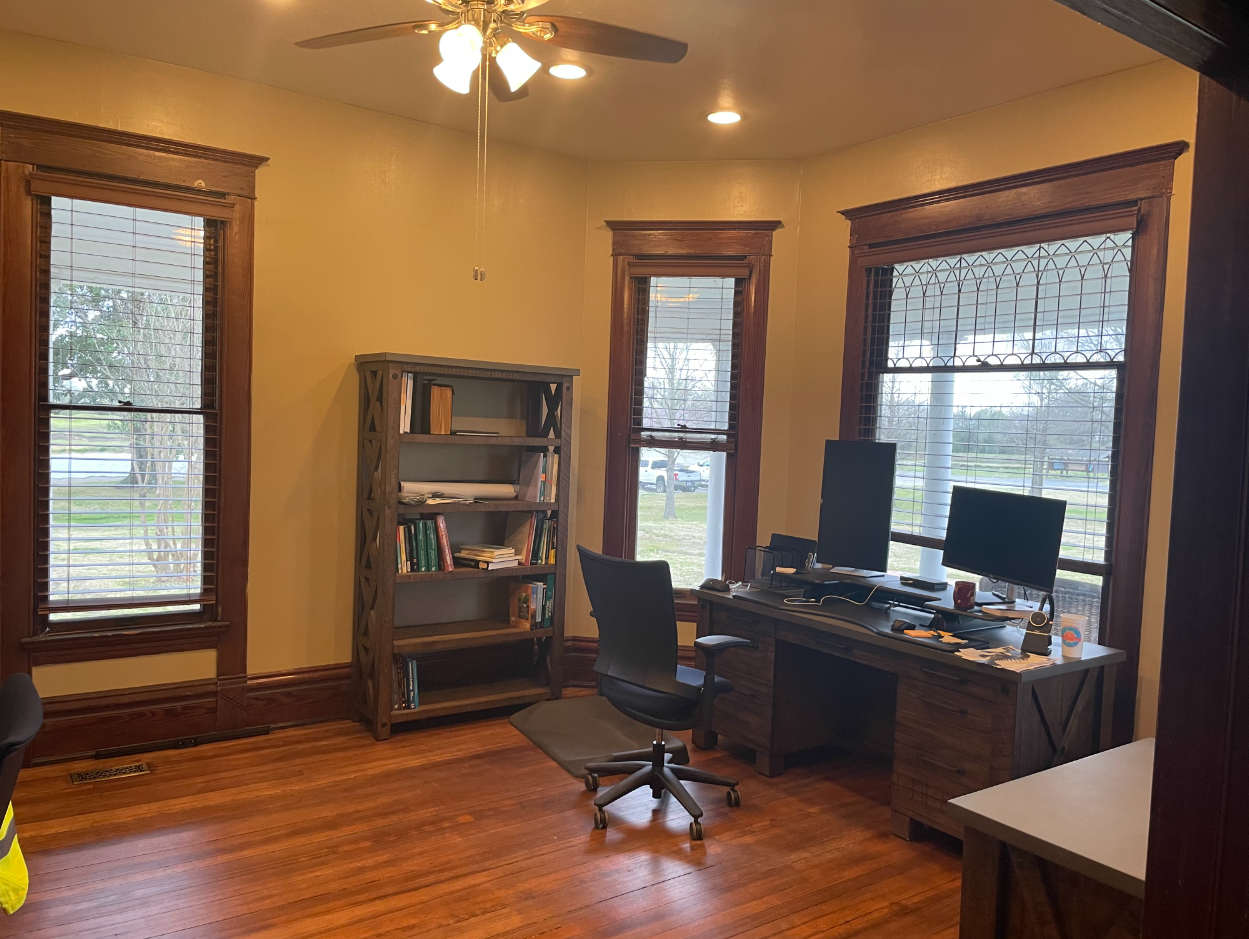
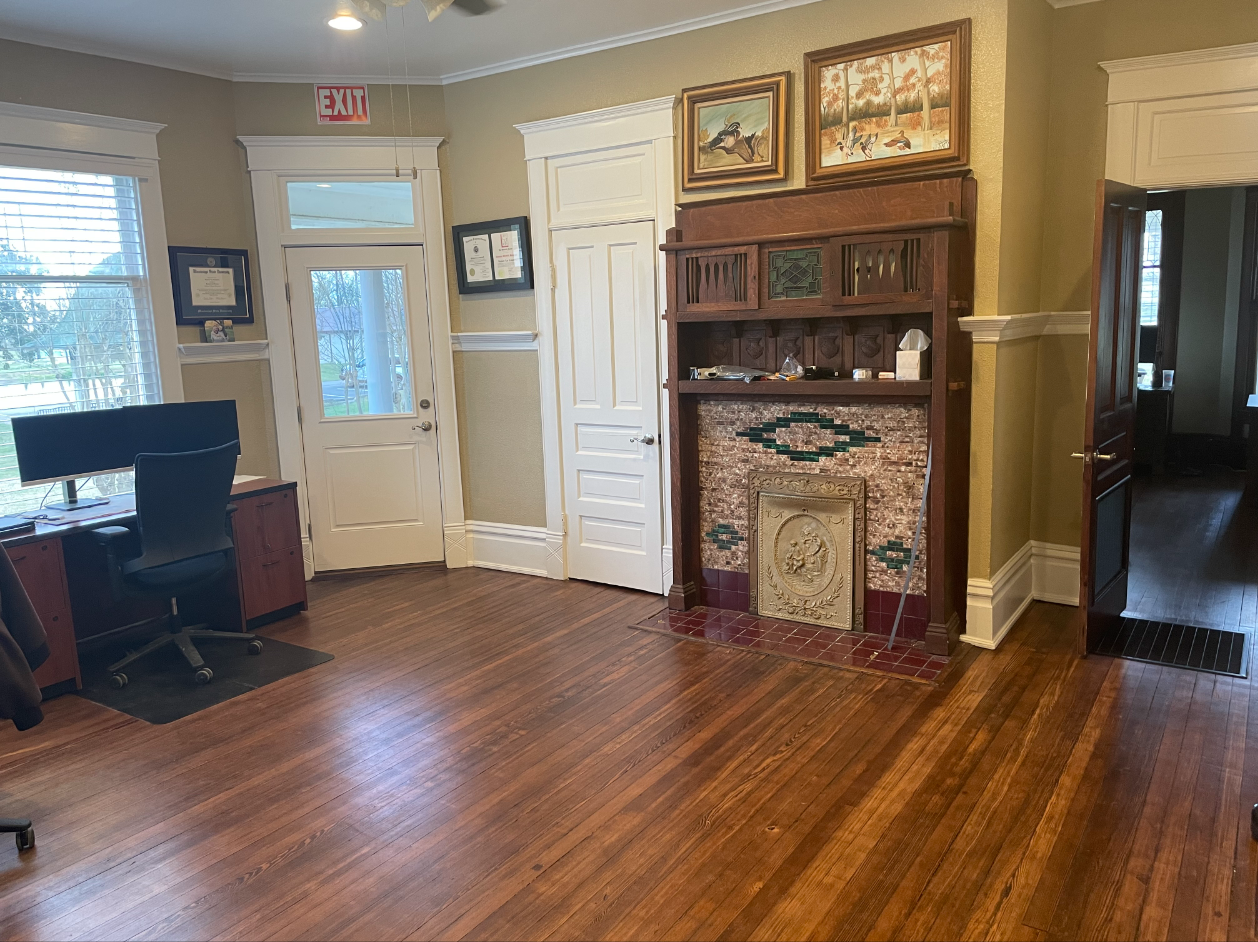
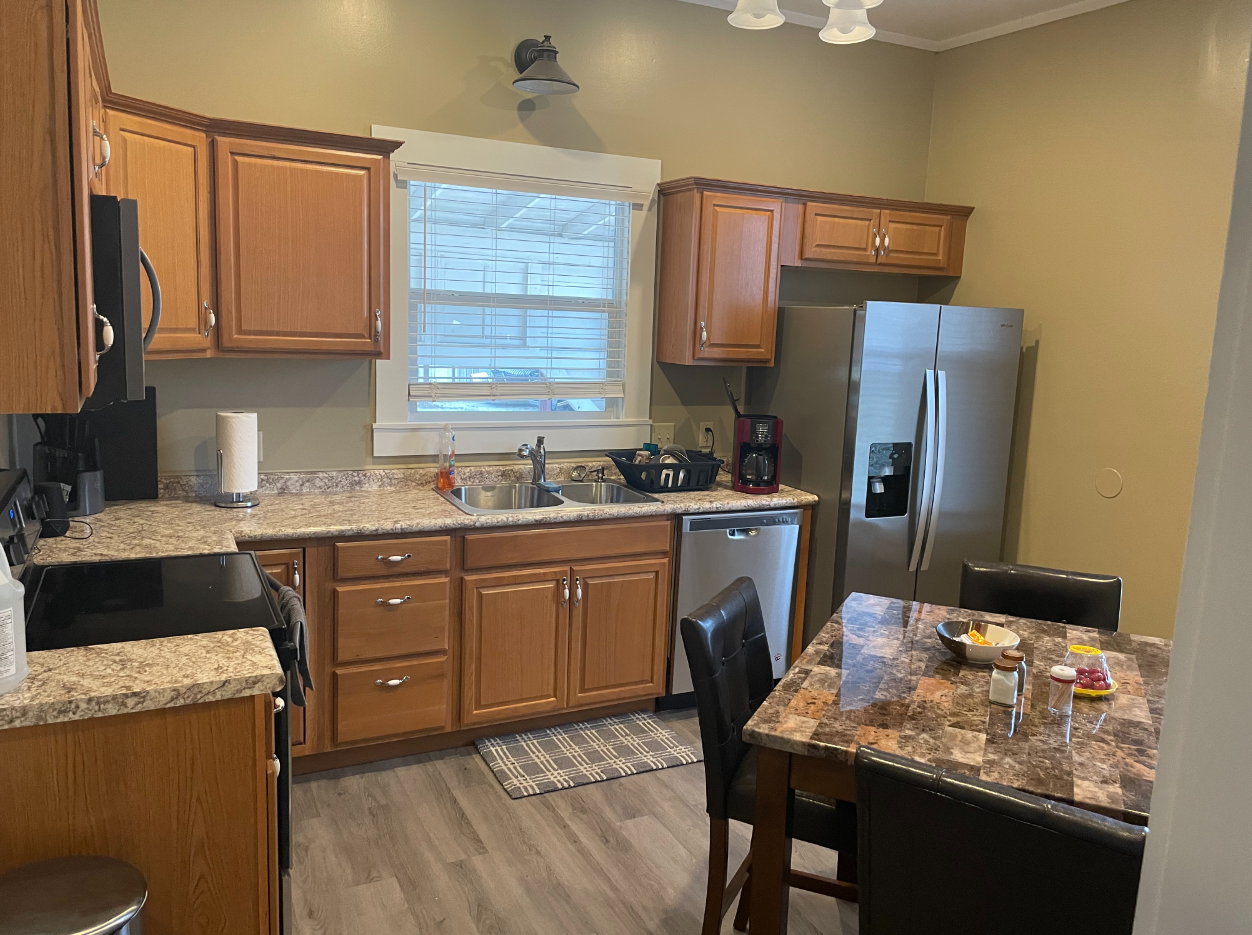
The renovated interior of the ground floor of the Old Superintendent's House – office space at left and center, and the kitchen at right— in 2022.

The historic manager's house ceased to serve as the manager's residence in the 1980s, and after that the Tupelo Garden Club supervised and maintained the house and its grounds for a number of years. The club offered tours of the house, which it made available to host teas, weddings, luncheons, picnics, and other social functions. By around 2010, the house had become so dilapidated that it ceased to host such events and the garden club withdrew. The house's future as a viable structure was in doubt. In 2017, however, a hatchery employee and a volunteer began a restoration of the house that involved remodeling it and replacing its plumbing and electrical wiring. In 2022 they completed work on the ground floor – which they converted into office space for the Lower Mississippi River Fish and Wildlife Conservation Office and an employee from the Wadmalaw Island Fish and Wildlife Conservation Office – while they continued their work to convert the upper story into a dormitory to house U.S. Fish and Wildlife Service employees on temporary assignments at the hatchery, summer interns, and university students conducting research projects. The hatchery received a Cultural Resource Protection Award for its restoration work at the house.

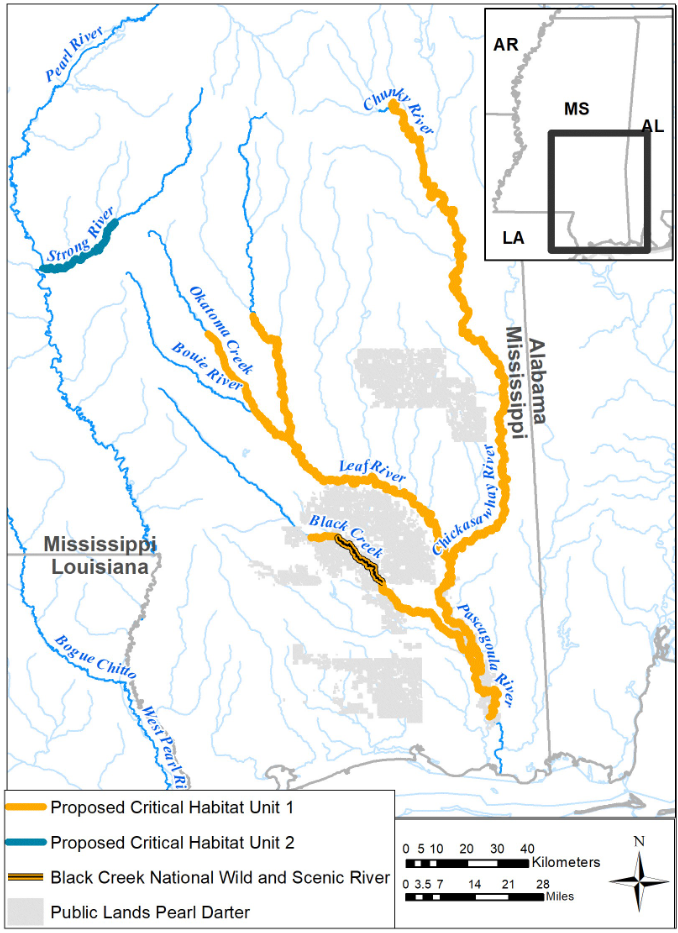
The critical habitat for the pearl darter (Percina aurora) the United States Fish and Wildlife Service proposed in 2021.

On March 14, 2018, a bronze bust of John Mills Allen was unveiled as part of a memorial at the hatchery on the grounds of the historic manager's house. The bust was dedicated to the memory of a past president of the Tupelo Garden Club.

Although it survived in the Pascagoula River watershed, the pearl darter (Percina aurora) disappeared from the Pearl River watershed in Mississippi and Louisiana around 1980, and the species was listed as threatened in 2017. In response, the Fish and Wildlife Service began work to restore the species to the Pearl River. By 2021, the Private John Allen National Fish Hatchery had developed, tested, and proven methods and facilities for propagating the species, enabling the Fish and Wildlife Service in 2021 to propose a critical habitat for the pearl darter in the Pascagoula River watershed and in a portion of the Strong River, a tributary of the Pearl River.

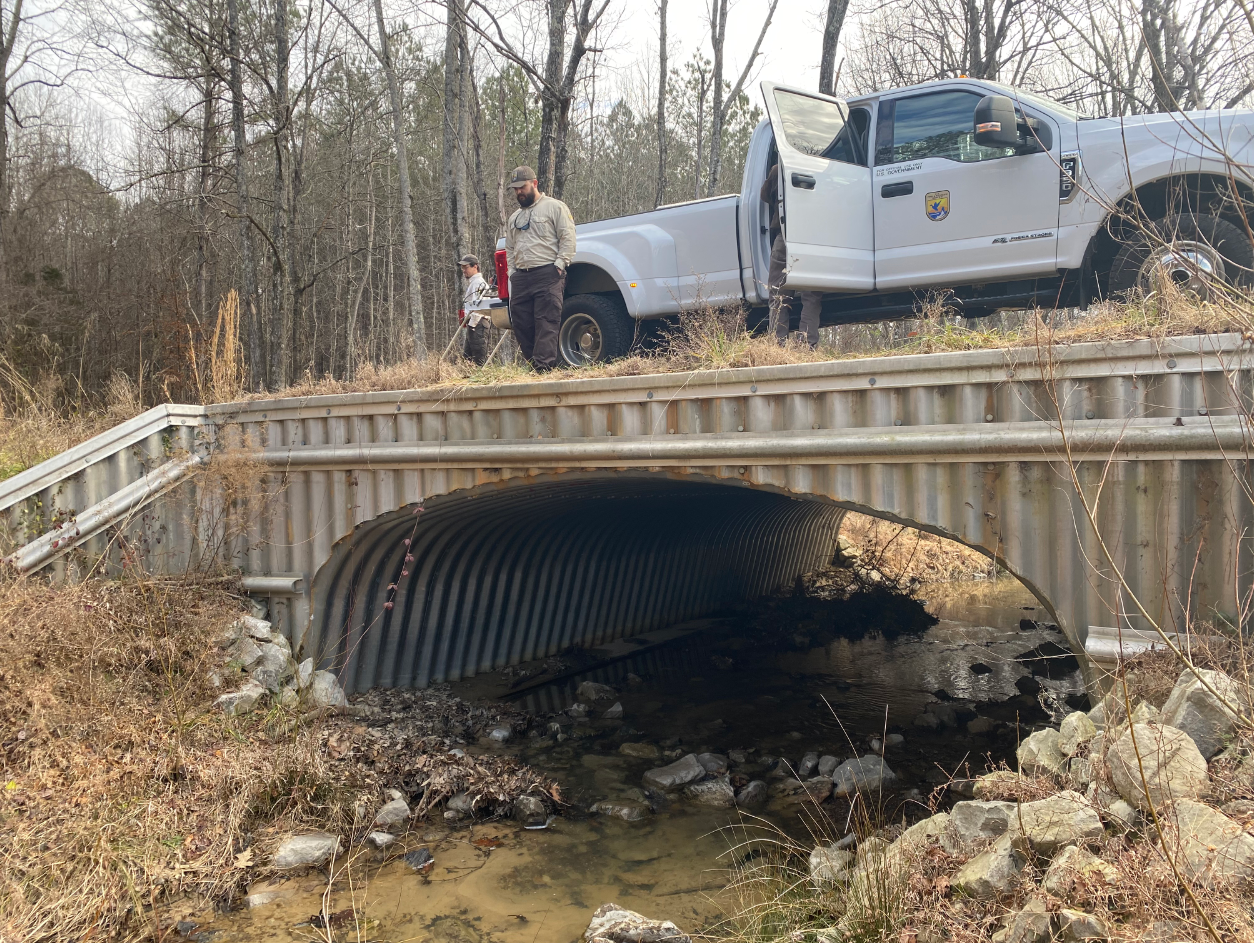
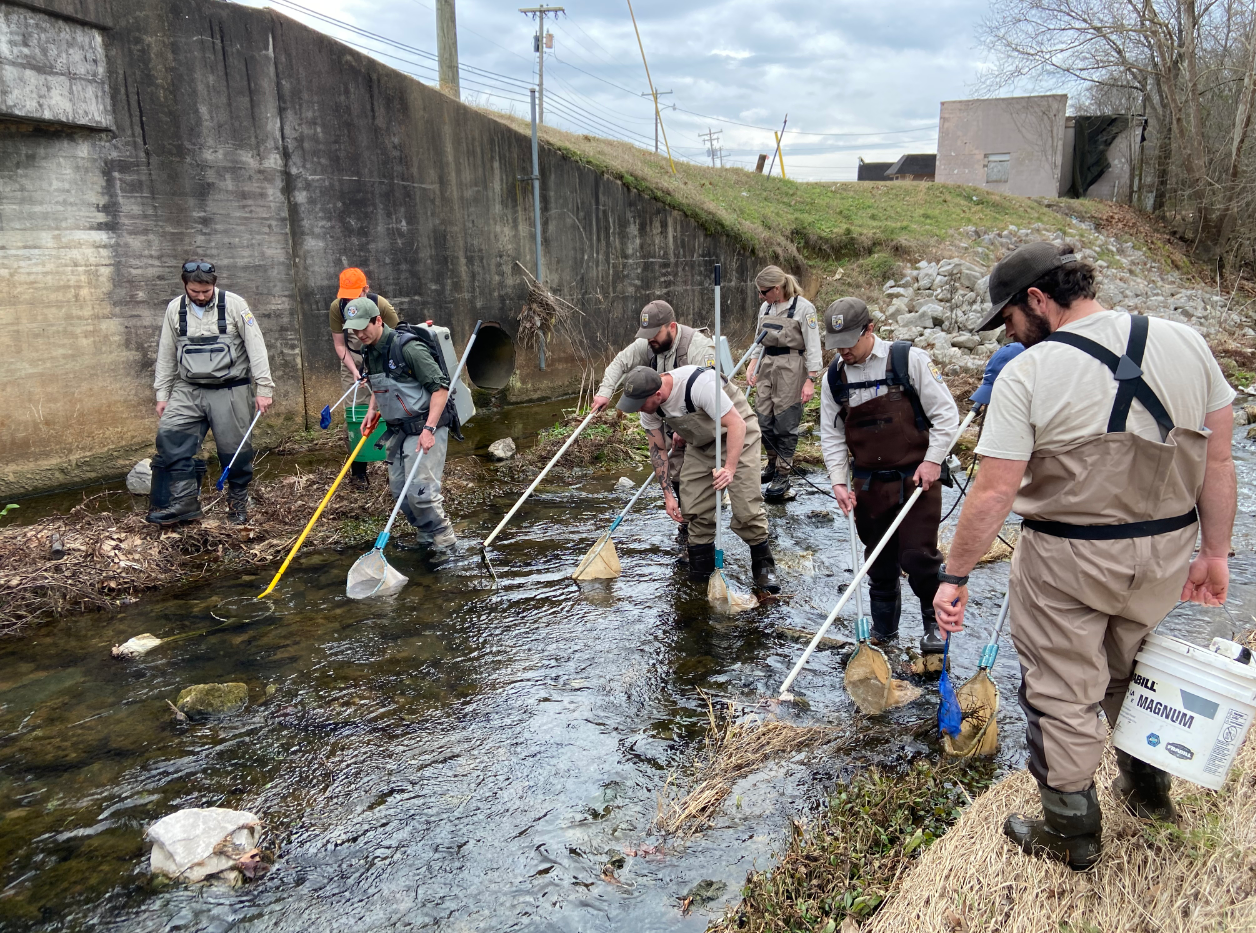
LEFT: U.S. Fish and Wildlife Service biologists inspect an arched bottomless culvert installed in 2017 over Smith Creek in Calhoun County, Mississippi, to restore access to the creek for the Yoknapatawpha darter (Etheostoma faulkneri). RIGHT: U.S. Fish and Wildlife Service and Mississippi Department of Wildlife, Fisheries, and Parks personnel use electrofishing techniques to survey Smith Creek for Yoknapatawpha darters on February 1, 2022.

The Yoknapatawpha darter (Etheostoma faulkneri) disappeared from Smith Creek in the 1980s, and a survey by U.S. Fish and Wildlife Service and Mississippi Department of Wildlife, Fisheries, and Parks employees of over 11,000 feet (3,350 meters) of the creek in 2017 confirmed the complete absence of the species. In response, the Private John Allen National Fish Hatchery, began a species recovery effort with a goal of establishing a self-sustaining and self-reproducing population of Yoknapatawpha darter in Smith Creek. In 2017, the hatchery's Southeast Aquatic Habitat Restoration Team removed a raised culvert which was limiting passage in Smith Creek and replaced it with a bottomless arched aluminium culvert which restored the Yoknapatawpha darter's access to Smith Creek. Thereafter, the Fish and Wildlife Service collected Yoknapatawpha darters annually to establish and maintain a broodstock of the species at the Private John Allen National Fish Hatchery, and in 2018 the hatchery's staff began an effort to propagate, tag, and reintroduce Yoknapatawpha darters into the creek. During 2021 sampling, the hatchery collected 16 tagged individuals from two separate year classes along with 11 individuals of different sizes with no tags, documenting the first natural spawning of the species in Smith Creek since the 1980s. As a result, the hatchery received a United States Department of the Interior Environmental Achievement Award for Environmental Remediation and Restoration for fiscal year 2021 (October 1, 2020–September 30, 2021). On February 1, 2022, Fish and Wildlife Service and Mississippi Department of Wildlife, Fisheries, and Parks personnel used electrofishing techniques to survey Smith Creek for Yoknapatawpha darters and documented 13 tagged and 15 untagged fish, from which they collected genetic material for analysis at the University of Southern Mississippi for genetic diversity, which is important for the success of the population restoration project.

Similarly, frecklebelly madtoms disappeared from Bull Mountain Creek, a tributary of the Tombigbee River, by the early 1980s after the completion of the Tennessee–Tombigbee Waterway blocked their passage into both the creek and the main stem of the Tombigbee River. The hatchery partnered with the U.S. Fish and Wildlife Service's Mississippi Ecological Services Field Office, the Mississippi Department of Wildlife, Fisheries, and Parks, the Lower Mississippi River Fish and Wildlife Conservation Office, the Wadmalaw Island Fish and Wildlife Conservation Office, and the Baton Rouge Conservation Office to create a propagation and restoration plan for the frecklebelly madtom. In November 2021, the team collected 400 frecklebelly madtoms from the East Tombigbee River and reintroduced them into Bull Mountain Creek in the hope that the reintroduced fish will survive and spawn offspring. In 2022, the hatchery's staff and their partners planned to return to Bull Mountain Creek to assess the success of the reintroduction plan.

== Recreation ==
As of 2024, approximately 20,000 people visit the hatchery annually. Brochures and other hatchery information for visitors is available at the hatchery's administrative building. Fishing is not permitted on the property except during the occasional fishing events the hatchery hosts, but visitors are free to wander the grounds and see the hatchery's fish ponds and raceways and the fish it is raising in them. Visitors occasionally may see hatchery staff feeding the fish or transferring or harvesting fish from a production pond. Generally, the ponds are full during the warm months of the year and empty during the winter, when they are drained and allowed to dry out. Seasonally, visitors can see fish in the holding house, where the staff loads distribution trucks which transport fish to stocking sites; at various times throughout each year the holding house may be in use or empty, depending on whether or not ponds have been drained and the seasonal schedule for stocking fish. The hatchery offers group tours by appointment.

The Pond Loop Trail is a 0.19-mile (0.31 km) long footpath which runs through the hatchery's grounds from a visitor display area on Fish Hatchery Drive and around some of the fish ponds to the vicinity of the holding house. The trail has interpretive signs which provide visitors with information about the hatchery, its history, and the species it produces.

The hatchery's grounds include a wildlife viewing area visited by an abundance of birds, including Canada geese (Branta canadensis), egrets (subfamily Ardeinae), herons (family Ardeidae), mallards (Anas platyrhynchos), mourning doves (Zenaida macroura), ospreys (Pandion haliaetus), and various songbirds (suborder Passeri). The Audubon Society lists the hatchery grounds as a major birdwatching area.

The public also may view the historic hatchery manager's house, a Queen Anne Revival-style building which was added to the National Register of Historic Places as the "Old Superintendent's House, Tupelo Fish Hatchery," on July 14, 1992. The hatchery encourages artists to paint and sketch the house. The grounds surrounding the home make up the hatchery's Backyard Habitats, which contain a variety of native plants – many of them "antique" varieties donated as cuttings from plants grown over many generations since the beginning of the 20th century – which are designed to attract a variety of birds, insects, and other wildlife. The house's Grandmother Garden provides a scenic venue for social events, and a memorial to John Mills Allen also lies on the house's grounds.

== See also ==
- National Fish Hatchery System
- List of National Fish Hatcheries in the United States
