= North Broadway Historic District =

North Broadway Historic District or North Broadway (in the United States) may refer to:

- North Broadway Historic District (Leavenworth, Kansas), listed on the NRHP in Kansas
- North Broadway-Short Street Historic District, Lexington, Kentucky, listed on the NRHP in Kentucky
- North Broadway Historic District (Tupelo, Mississippi), listed on the NRHP in Mississippi
- East North Broadway Historic District, Clintonville, Columbus, Ohio
- North Broadway Historic District (Lebanon, Ohio), listed on the NRHP in Ohio
- North Broadway Street Historic District, De Pere, Wisconsin, listed on the NRHP in Wisconsin
