= Mississippi Industrial College =

College in Mississippi, USA

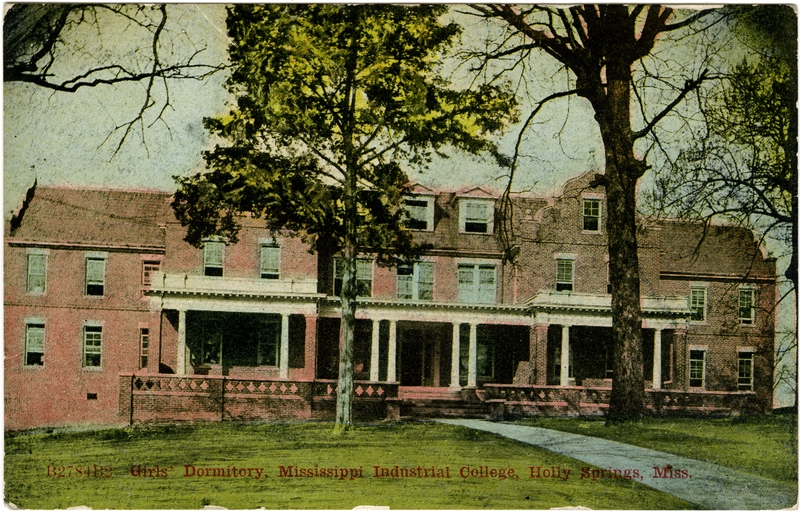
Mississippi Industrial College girls' dormitory

Mississippi Industrial College was a historically black college in Holly Springs, Mississippi. It was founded in 1905 by the Mississippi Conference of the Colored Methodist Episcopal Church. After desegregation of community colleges in the mid-20th century, it had trouble competing and eventually closed in 1982. The campus was listed as a historic site on the National Register of Historic Places in 1980 and was acquired by Rust College in 2008.

== History ==
Intended to train students for agriculture and trades, the school was located on a 120-acre (49 ha) campus. The Mississippi Conference of the Colored Methodist Episcopal Church founded it in 1905. In January 1906 the first academic session began. Two hundred students were enrolled by May 1906. By 1908 the school had 450 students.

By 1912 the college was running an extension program to allow students who didn't have time to attend its regular programs to benefit from the education it provided. According to the Times-Picayune, then president D. C. Potts told a meeting of the Mississippi Colored Methodist Conference in reference to this that "an institution [MIC] for which the people were sacrificing ought to be able to help more than the few students who attended its session."

After the desegregation of Mississippi community colleges, many students chose to go to other schools. In addition, student expectations were changing. In 1982 the campus closed.

In November 1999 the Mississippi Industrial College Alumni Association, Inc. (MICAAI) was organized in order to preserve the campus and buildings, which had been listed on the National Register of Historic Places in 1980. The University of Mississippi said "the campus now lies in disrepair." In 2008 Rust College acquired the defunct institution's campus.

== Notable faculty and alumni ==
- Lawrence Autry, 1952 - First black elected Superintendent of Education for Marshall County, Mississippi
- Osborne Bell, 1963 - First black elected sheriff of Marshall County since the Reconstruction era
- Oree Broomfield, 1953 - 45th Bishop of the CME Church, elected 1982
- Mary Callaway, 1912 - M. A., English, Stanford University, 1916
- C. D. Coleman, 1947 - 36th Bishop of the CME Church, elected 1974
- Elias Cottrell (1853-1937) - Born into slavery, college's founder, 7th Bishop of the CME Church, elected 1894
- Dr. Jessie Edwards, 1975 - First black mayor of Coldwater; Coldwater library is named in his honor; city alderman 1981-85; mayor 1989-2001, 2005-2013, and 2017-2021
- Viola Foster, 1956 - First black mayor of Plantersville
- W. M. Frazier, President of MIC, 1933-55
- Earl Glass, 1963 - NCAA Division II national basketball leading scorer in 1962–63, 42.9 points per game
- William M. Henley, 1957 - Educator (Mathematics, Physics, and Chemistry); Holly Springs alderman; Mississippi high school basketball and football coach
- Paul Holly, 1959 - educator and sports official in the ABA, NBA, and in Collegiate Football and Basketball (SWAC)
- Charles Jones, 1967 - Superintendent of Education in Arkansas school district
- Frank Jones, 1963 - First black mayor of Oakland
- Robert Ledbetter, 1960 - Football coach; Norfolk State University, New Orleans Saints, New York Giants, New York Jets
- Dr. Fred Pinson, MD, 1910
- Dr. E. E. Rankin, 1936 - President of MIC, 1957-78
- Dr. Lacey Reynolds, 1974 - Basketball Coach, Mississippi Industrial College, LeMoyne–Owen College, Grambling, Texas Southern; and educator, Professor in the Texas Southern University Department Of Health, Kinesiology & Sport Studies
- Charles Robinson, 1968 - Superintendent of Education in Arkansas school district
- Dr. Ansell R. Russell, MD, 1911
- Dr. Dr. S. N. Sisson, MD, 1917
- Paul A. G. Stewart, 1961 - 50th Bishop of the CME Church, Elected, 1998
- Lafayette Stribling, 1957 - Hall of Fame basketball coach; Mississippi Association of Coaches Hall of Fame (1989), SWAC Hall of Fame (2006), Mississippi Valley Sports Hall of Fame (2010), SWAC Coach of the Year (1992)
- James Holmes Teer (1862-1938) - College's Board of Trustees, as Treasurer
- Jim Thomas, 1963 - Canadian Football League All-Star
- Jesse Townsend, 1957 - baseball player; Kansas City Monarchs of the Negro American League 1958-1959; led the league in strikeouts in 1958
- Dr. J. Y. Trice, 1946 - Minister and Presiding Elder, CME Church; Mayor, City of Rosedale, MS, (1985–2001)
- Irwin Whitaker, 1963 - First black elected Superintendent of Education for Leflore County, Mississippi
- Dr. Elbert B. White 1965 - Associate dean of undergraduate studies, and associate professor of engineering at George Mason University
