= National Register of Historic Places listings in Lee County, Mississippi =

Location of Lee County in Mississippi

This is a list of the National Register of Historic Places listings in Lee County, Mississippi.

This is intended to be a complete list of the properties and districts on the National Register of Historic Places in Lee County, Mississippi, United States. Latitude and longitude coordinates are provided for many National Register properties and districts; these locations may be seen together in a map.

There are 28 properties and districts listed on the National Register in the county.

This National Park Service list is complete through NPS recent listings posted October 23, 2026.

== Current listings ==
	Name on the Register	Image	Date listed	Location	City or town	Description
1	Baldwyn Historic District		July 20, 2011 (#11000471)	Roughly along E. & W. Main Sts. & N. & S. 2nd Ave. 34°30′33″N 88°38′01″W	Baldwyn	
2	Baldwyn Medical Group		September 16, 2021 (#100006895)	300 Mill St. 34°30′31″N 88°38′14″W	Baldwyn	
3	Benson Farm House		February 12, 2024 (#100009039)	486 Cty. Rd. 520; 34°09′17″N 88°40′08″W	Shannon vicinity	
4	Brices Cross Roads National Battlefield Site	Brices Cross Roads National Battlefield Site	October 15, 1966 (#66000067)	6 miles west of Baldwyn on Mississippi Highway 370; 34°30′24″N 88°43′44″W	Baldwyn	
5	Barlow Burrow House	Barlow Burrow House	March 1, 1984 (#84002251)	157 N. 2nd St. 34°22′45″N 88°40′53″W	Saltillo	
6	Carnation Milk Factory	Carnation Milk Factory	August 20, 2009 (#09000624)	520 Carnation St. 34°15′14″N 88°42′34″W	Tupelo	
7	R.C. Clark House	R.C. Clark House	November 5, 2010 (#10000883)	215 N. Church St. 34°15′31″N 88°42′31″W	Tupelo	
8	Downtown Tupelo Historic District	Downtown Tupelo Historic District	June 2, 2014 (#14000276)	Roughly bounded by Jefferson, Madison. N. Front, & Kansas City Southern RR; also roughly bounded by Clark Street, Kansas City Railroad line, North Santa Fe Railroad line, and South Church St. 34°15′27″N 88°42′25″W	Tupelo	Second set of boundaries represent a boundary increase approved January 28, 2025.
9	First Methodist Church	First Methodist Church	March 15, 1990 (#90000348)	412 W. Main St. 34°15′28″N 88°42′27″W	Tupelo	
10	R.F. Goodlett House	R.F. Goodlett House	April 3, 1992 (#92000162)	219 Broadway; 34°15′31″N 88°42′20″W	Tupelo	
11	Highland Circle Historic District		March 20, 2006 (#06000196)	Highland Circle neighborhood, including parts of N. Madison St., Highland Circle, Oak Grove Rd., and W. Jackson St. 34°16′01″N 88°42′43″W	Tupelo	
12	Lee County Courthouse	Lee County Courthouse	April 3, 1992 (#92000161)	Court St. between Spring and Broadway; 34°15′31″N 88°42′17″W	Tupelo	
13	Mill Village Historic District		April 3, 1992 (#92000159)	Roughly bounded by the Illinois Central and St. Louis – San Francisco railroad tracks and Chestnut and Green Sts. 34°15′08″N 88°42′19″W	Tupelo	
14	Mutt-Thomason Site	Mutt-Thomason Site	August 31, 1978 (#78001611)	Address restricted	Tupelo	
15	North Broadway Historic District	North Broadway Historic District	October 31, 1985 (#85003438)	300 block of N. Broadway St. 34°15′37″N 88°42′20″W	Tupelo	
16	North Church Primary School	North Church Primary School	April 3, 1992 (#92000164)	Southwestern corner of the junction of Church and Jackson Sts. 34°15′48″N 88°42′33″W	Tupelo	
17	Old Superintendent's House, Tupelo Fish Hatchery	Old Superintendent's House, Tupelo Fish Hatchery	July 14, 1992 (#92000837)	111 Elizabeth St. 34°14′55″N 88°42′07″W	Tupelo	
18	Peoples Bank and Trust Company	Peoples Bank and Trust Company	August 24, 1978 (#78001610)	211 Main St. 34°15′26″N 88°42′17″W	Tupelo	
19	The Raymond House	The Raymond House	April 1, 2025 (#100009996)	5015 Raymond Avenue; 34°11′45″N 88°43′13″W	Verona	
20	South Church Street Historic District		April 3, 1992 (#92000160)	602-713 S. Church St. 34°15′05″N 88°42′30″W	Tupelo	
21	Spain House	Spain House	March 21, 2011 (#11000109)	553 W. Main St. 34°15′26″N 88°42′37″W	Tupelo	
22	F.L. Spight House	F.L. Spight House	April 3, 1992 (#92000163)	363 N. Broadway; 34°15′41″N 88°42′20″W	Tupelo	
23	Spring Hill Missionary Baptist Church		April 11, 2023 (#100008603)	589 North Green St. 34°16′06″N 88°42′27″W	Tupelo	
24	Stewart-Anderson House	Stewart-Anderson House	June 24, 1994 (#94000644)	433 N. Church St. 34°15′45″N 88°42′34″W	Tupelo	
25	Tombigbee State Park	Tombigbee State Park	March 25, 1999 (#99000382)	264 Cabin Dr. 34°13′51″N 88°37′24″W	Tupelo	
26	Tupelo Downtown Neighborhood Historic District		September 28, 2021 (#100007053)	Roughly bounded by East Jackson, North Spring, Main, West Jefferson, and North Gloster Sts. 34°15′42″N 88°42′32″W	Tupelo	
27	Tupelo Homesteads	Tupelo Homesteads	February 7, 1997 (#97000035)	County Roads 657 and 665 and County Drive 647, south of its junction with the Natchez Trace Parkway; 34°19′34″N 88°42′27″W	Tupelo	
28	Tupelo National Battlefield	Tupelo National Battlefield	October 15, 1966 (#66000068)	On Mississippi Highway 6 about 1 mile west of its junction with U.S. Route 45; 34°15′19″N 88°44′14″W	Tupelo	

== See also ==
- List of National Historic Landmarks in Mississippi
- National Register of Historic Places listings in Mississippi
