= Dorothy Vredenburgh Bush =

American political activist (1916–1991)

- Born: Dorothy McElroy; December 8, 1916; Baldwyn, Mississippi, US
- Died: December 21, 1991 (aged 75); Naples, Florida
- Occupation: Secretary to the Democratic National Committee
- Years active: 1944–1988
- Spouse(s): Peter Vredenburgh (1940–1956); John W. Bush (1962–1991)

Dorothy McElroy Vredenburgh Bush (December 8, 1916 – December 21, 1991) was an American political activist. She was the secretary of the Democratic National Committee from 1944 to 1988. She also became the vice-president of the Young Democratic Clubs of America in 1943, being the first woman to hold that position.

== Early life and education ==
Dorothy McElroy was born on December 8, 1916, in Baldwyn, Mississippi, to Will Lee McElroy, a postmaster, and Lany McElroy (née Holland). She had two older sisters. Her family moved to Columbus, Mississippi, when she was in eighth grade to enable the girls to attend the Mississippi State College for Women. Dorothy graduated from a Columbus high school in 1933 and went on to earn her B.S. in secretarial studies at Mississippi State College for Women in 1937. In the summer of 1935, she also attended George Washington University in Washington, D.C. After receiving her degree, she worked for the Tennessee Coal, Iron and Railroad Company in its Birmingham office for three years.

== Political activism ==
In 1941, she was elected national committeewoman for the Alabama Young Democrats. Later that same year she was elected assistant secretary for that organization. In 1943, she was elected to the vice-presidency of the Young Democratic Clubs of America. She was the first woman to hold that position, at age 27.

In 1944, she was named secretary to the Democratic National Committee and, in that capacity, called roll at twelve successive Democratic National Conventions, from 1944 to 1988. She was the first woman and youngest person to hold that position. She was well known for her exaggerated Southern pronunciation of "Alabama" the first state in the roll call, except for roll calls at the 1972 Democratic National Convention.

== Personal life ==
McElroy married her first husband, Peter Vredenburgh, on December 27, 1940; they had met when he came to Birmingham to attend the funeral of Speaker Will Bankhead. Peter Vredenburgh died in 1956. In 1962, Dorothy remarried to John W. Bush, who was at the time a member of the Interstate Commerce Commission.

She died of lung cancer on December 21, 1991, in Naples, Florida.
