= Lacey Reynolds =

American basketball coach

Biographical details
- Born: c. 1952 (age 73–74); Shelby, Mississippi, U.S.

Playing career
- 1970–1972: Utica JC

Coaching career (HC unless noted)
- 1975–1977: Mississippi Industrial
- 1977–1983: LeMoyne–Owen (assistant)
- 1983–1995: Texas Southern (assistant)
- 1995–1999: Grambling State
- 2000–2003: Texas Southern (women's)

Head coaching record
- Overall: 44–66 (college)

Lacey Reynolds (born c. 1952) is an American former college basketball coach. He served as the head coach of the Grambling State Tigers and Texas Southern Lady Tigers. Reynolds is from Shelby, Mississippi.

== Coaching career ==
Reynolds attended Utica Junior College from 1970 to 1972 and played on the basketball team. He also played at Mississippi Industrial College, where, aged 23, he received his first head coaching role in 1975. Reynolds worked as an assistant coach and physical education instructor at LeMoyne–Owen College from 1977 to 1983. He served as an assistant coach for the Texas Southern Tigers from 1983 to 1995.

On June 8, 1995, Reynolds was appointed head coach of the Grambling State Tigers. His only winning season was in 1997–98 when the Tigers amassed a 16–12 record, finished third in the Southwestern Athletic Conference (SWAC) and advanced to the tournament semifinals. Reynolds accumulated a 44–66 record over four seasons with the Tigers and was fired on April 17, 1999. He served as head coach of the Texas Southern Lady Tigers from 2000 until his resignation in May 2003. During a January 1, 2003, game against the TCU Horned Frogs, his Lady Tigers posted the fewest points in an NCAA Division I women's basketball game when they lost 76–16.

Reynolds applied for the head coaching role of the Texas Southern Tigers in 2007. He was a finalist for the head coaching position of the Mississippi Valley State Delta Devils in 2008.

== Academic career ==
Reynolds earned a master's degree in physical education from Delta State University in 1975. He received his doctorate in education from Texas Southern University in 2007 and works as a professor in the College of Education at Texas Southern.
