= R. H. Allen =

American merchant and politician (1840-1895)

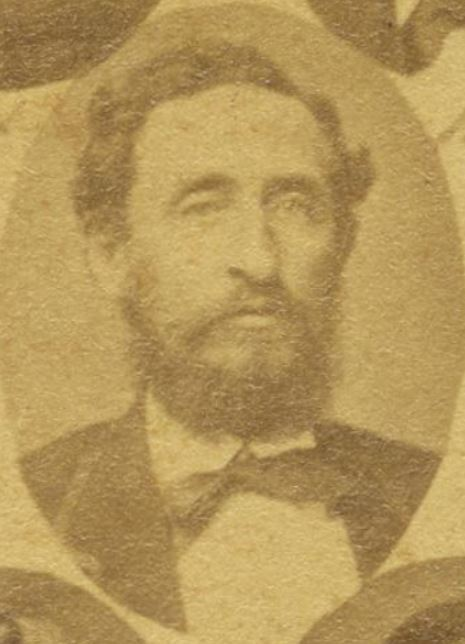
- c. 1878

Member of the Mississippi State Senate from the 21st district
- In office January 1872 – January 1880
- Preceded by: J. M. Stone
- Succeeded by: David Johnson

Personal details
- Born: February 24, 1840 Mississippi, U.S.
- Died: November 9, 1895 (aged 55) Alva, Oklahoma Territory, U.S.
- Party: Democratic

Robert Harrison Allen (February 24, 1840 – November 9, 1895) was an American merchant, planter, and Democratic politician. He represented Itawamba and Lee Counties in the Mississippi State Senate from 1872 to 1880.

== Biography ==
Robert Harrison Allen was born on February 24, 1840, in Mississippi. He was the son of David M. Allen and Sallie A. (Spencer) Allen. His brother was U.S. Congressman from Mississippi, John M. Allen. During the American Civil War, Allen served as a Lieutenant in the 19th Mississippi Infantry. He was a merchant and planter who lived in Baldwyn, Mississippi. In 1871, Allen was elected to represent the 21st District (Itawamba and Lee Counties) as a Democrat in the Mississippi State Senate. Allen continued serving through the 1878 session. Allen was the appointed by President Grover Cleveland to be a Receiver of Public Monies in the Oklahoma Territory. Allen died in Alva, Oklahoma Territory on November 9, 1895.
