= Tupelo National Battlefield =

Battlefield in Mississippi, United States

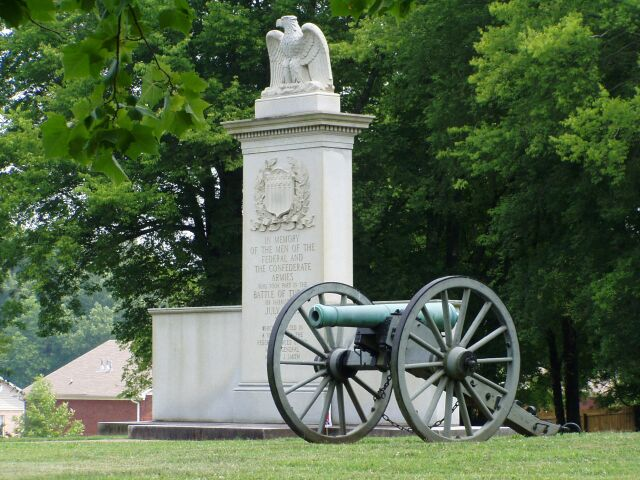
- Battle of Tupelo Memorial, 2006

- Map of Mississippi Tupelo National Battlefield (the United States)
- 34°15′20.4″N 88°44′13.2″W
- Location: Tupelo, Mississippi, United States

History
- Established: February 21, 1929 (War Dept.); August 10, 1933 (NPS)

Site notes
- Area: 1 acre (0.40 ha)
- Governing body: National Park Service
- Website: Tupelo National Battlefield

U.S. National Register of Historic Places
- Designated: October 15, 1966
- Reference no.: 66000068

Tupelo National Battlefield commemorates the Battle of Tupelo, also known as the Battle of Harrisburg, fought from July 14 to 15, 1864, near Tupelo, Mississippi during the American Civil War. The Union victory over Confederate forces in northeast Mississippi ensured the safety of Sherman's supply lines during the Atlanta campaign.

The 1-acre site on Main Street in Tupelo is a grassy park with a flagpole, memorial monument, and two cannons. There are no visitor services; information is provided at the visitor center for the Natchez Trace Parkway six miles north. The monument and site are very similar to that at Brices Cross Roads National Battlefield Site.

== Administrative history ==
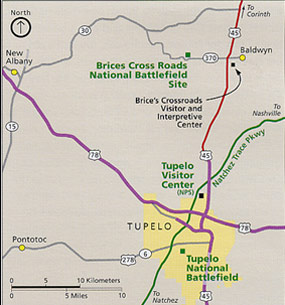
Tupelo area National Park Service map

The Tupelo National Battlefield was established as "Tupelo Battlefield Site" on February 21, 1929. The site was transferred from the United States War Department to the National Park Service on August 10, 1933, redesignated, and boundary changed on August 10, 1961. In 1936, the Tupelo-Gainesville Tornado destroyed the concrete monument to the battle, ripping it out of the ground and shattering it. The site was listed in the National Register of Historic Places on October 15, 1966.

== See also ==
- Brices Cross Roads National Battlefield Site
- Natchez Trace Parkway
- National Register of Historic Places listings in Lee County, Mississippi
