= Brices Cross Roads National Battlefield Site =

Battlefield in Mississippi, United States

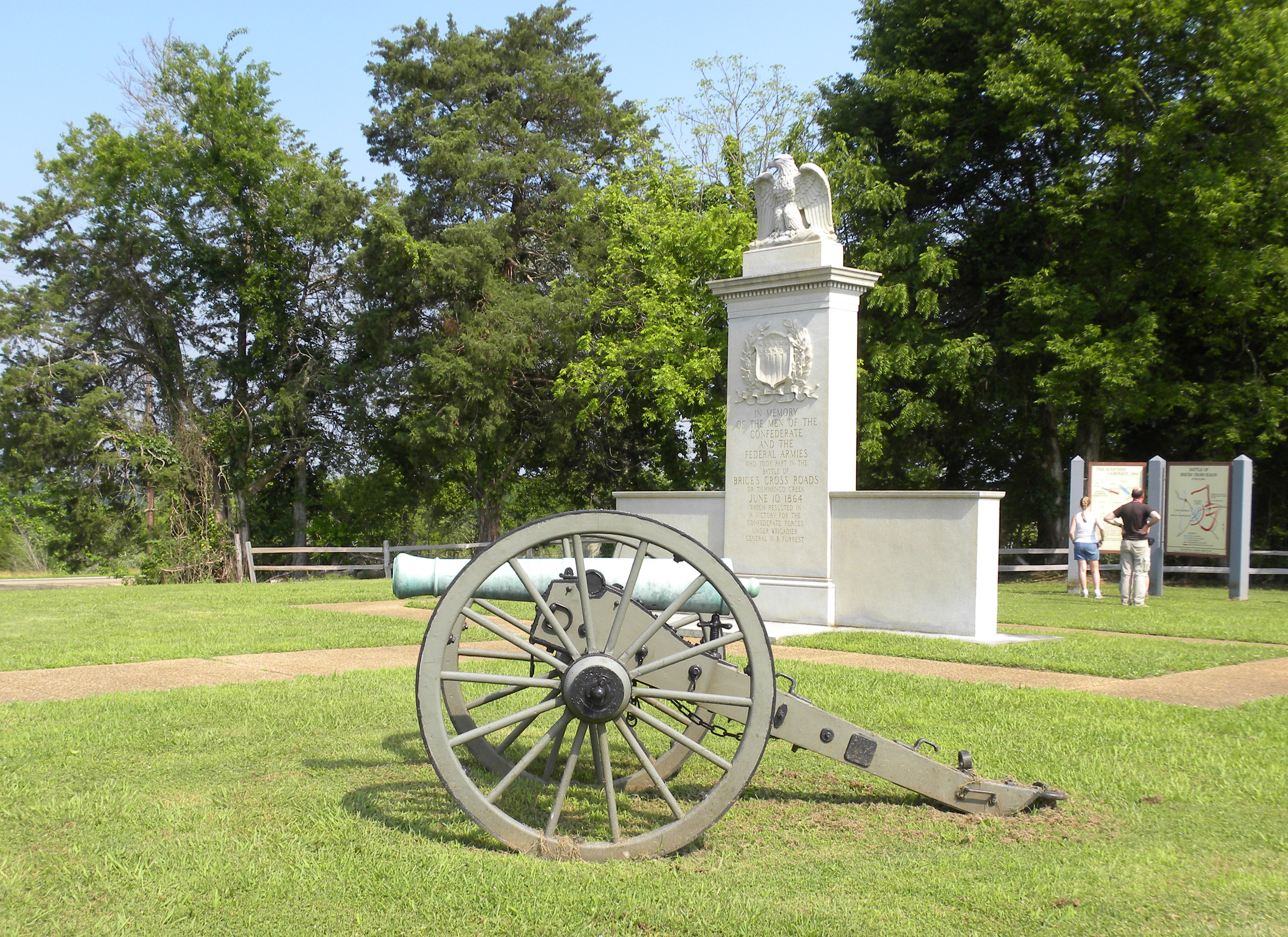
- Battle of Brices Cross Roads Memorial in 2010

- Location within Mississippi Location within the United States
- Location: Lee County, Mississippi, United States
- Nearest city: Baldwyn
- Coordinates: 34°30′22.0″N 88°43′44.0″W
- Area: 1.00 acre (0.40 ha)
- Established: February 21, 1929
- Visitors: 2,035 (in 1983)
- Governing body: National Park Service
- Website: Brices Cross Roads; National Battlefield Site

Brices Cross Roads National Battlefield Site memorializes the Battle of Brice's Cross Roads, in which a U.S. Army force was defeated by a smaller Confederate force commanded by Major-General Nathan Bedford Forrest on June 10, 1864, but nonetheless secured Union supply lines between Nashville and Chattanooga, Tennessee.

The 1-acre site is a grassy park with a flagpole, a memorial monument, and two cannons. There are no visitor services; information is provided at the visitor center for the Natchez Trace Parkway 15 miles south. The monument and site are very similar to that at Tupelo National Battlefield.

== Description ==
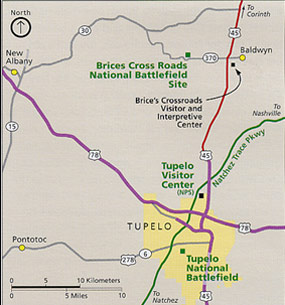
Tupelo area National Park Service map

The Brices Cross Roads National Battlefield Site, in Lee County, Mississippi, preserves the battlefield at Brices Cross Roads, which extended northward into southwestern Prentiss County. This is the spot where the Brice family house once stood. It is located about 6 miles (10 km) west of Baldwyn, on Highway 370. The site features a memorial erected soon after the battlefield was designated as a historic site in 1929. In addition, on June 11, 2005, a second memorial was dedicated to Confederate Capt. John W. Morton, Chief of Artillery, and his battery. Brices Cross Roads is the only component of the National Park System designated a "battlefield site".

The modern Bethany Presbyterian Church is located on the southeast side of the crossroads. At the time of the battle, this congregation's meeting house was located further south along Baldwyn Road. The Old Bethany Cemetery, adjacent to the battlefield site, predates the American Civil War. Many of the area's earliest settlers were buried there. The graves of more than 90 Confederate soldiers killed in the battle are also located in this cemetery. U.S. Army soldiers killed in the battle were buried in common graves on the battlefield but were later reinterred in the Memphis National Cemetery at Memphis, Tennessee.

The Brices Cross Roads Visitor Center, located in Baldwyn, is owned and operated by a public commission. Brices Cross Roads National Battlefield Commission, Inc., formed in 1994 by residents, is also involved in protecting the greater battlefield. With assistance from the American Battlefield Trust and the support of federal, state, and local governments, the commission has purchased for preservation 1,500 acres (6.1 km^{2}) of the original battlefield.

== Administrative history ==
The site was established on February 21, 1929, and transferred from the United States Department of War to the National Park Service on August 10, 1933. The battlefield was automatically listed on the National Register of Historic Places on October 15, 1966. It is administered under the Natchez Trace Parkway.

== See also ==
- Natchez Trace Parkway
- National Register of Historic Places listings in Lee County, Mississippi
- Tupelo National Battlefield
