= Paul A. G. Stewart =

Paul A. Stewart, Sr. was born June 21, 1941, to Leroy and Bessie Agnew Stewart in Baldwyn, Mississippi, where he spent his childhood. On July 1, 1998, he was elected the 50th Bishop of the Christian Methodist Episcopal (C.M.E.) Church at its Thirty-Third Quadrennial Session and the Thirty-Fourth General Conference.

== Education ==
Stewart attended Mississippi Industrial College, Holy Springs, Mississippi, and in 1961 obtained a Master of Divinity Degree from Phillips School of Theology of the Interdenominational Theological Center, and then in 1965 Master's Degree in Guidance and Counseling, University of Mississippi. In 1975 he graduated from the United States Military Academy for Chaplains, Staten Island, New York, and also 1975 received Clinical Pastoral Education (CPE) Training for Ministers, Fort Hood, Texas. In 1977 he attended training courses for ministering to cancer patients, University of Alabama. In 1980 he received an honorary Doctorate of Divinity Degree from Reed School of Religion, Los Angeles, CA, and in 1996 the Doctorate of Humane Letters from Miles College, Birmingham, May, 2002.

== Family life ==
Stewart is married to the former M. Earline Gardner. They have three children: Gloria Jean Stewart-Wicks, a teacher, Paul Jr., an Engineer, and Shinar LaDonna Stewart-Parnell, a teacher. They have two grandchildren.

== 50th bishop ==
Stewart was elected and consecrated bishop in 1998 at the 33rd Quadrennial Session and 34th General Conference. He was assigned to the Fifth Episcopal District of Alabama and Florida. In 2002 he was assigned to the Third Episcopal District: Southeast Missouri, Illinois & Wisconsin Region, the Michigan-Indiana Region and the Kansas-Missouri Region of churches in ten Midwestern states. He is the Chaplaincy Endorsing Agent for the Church, Chairman of the Board of Trustees of Phillips School of Theology, Atlanta, Vice Chairperson of the Board of Trustees of Miles College, Birmingham, and a member of the Advisory Board of the Institute of Church Administration and Management.
