= Baldwyn, Mississippi =

City in Mississippi, United States

- City
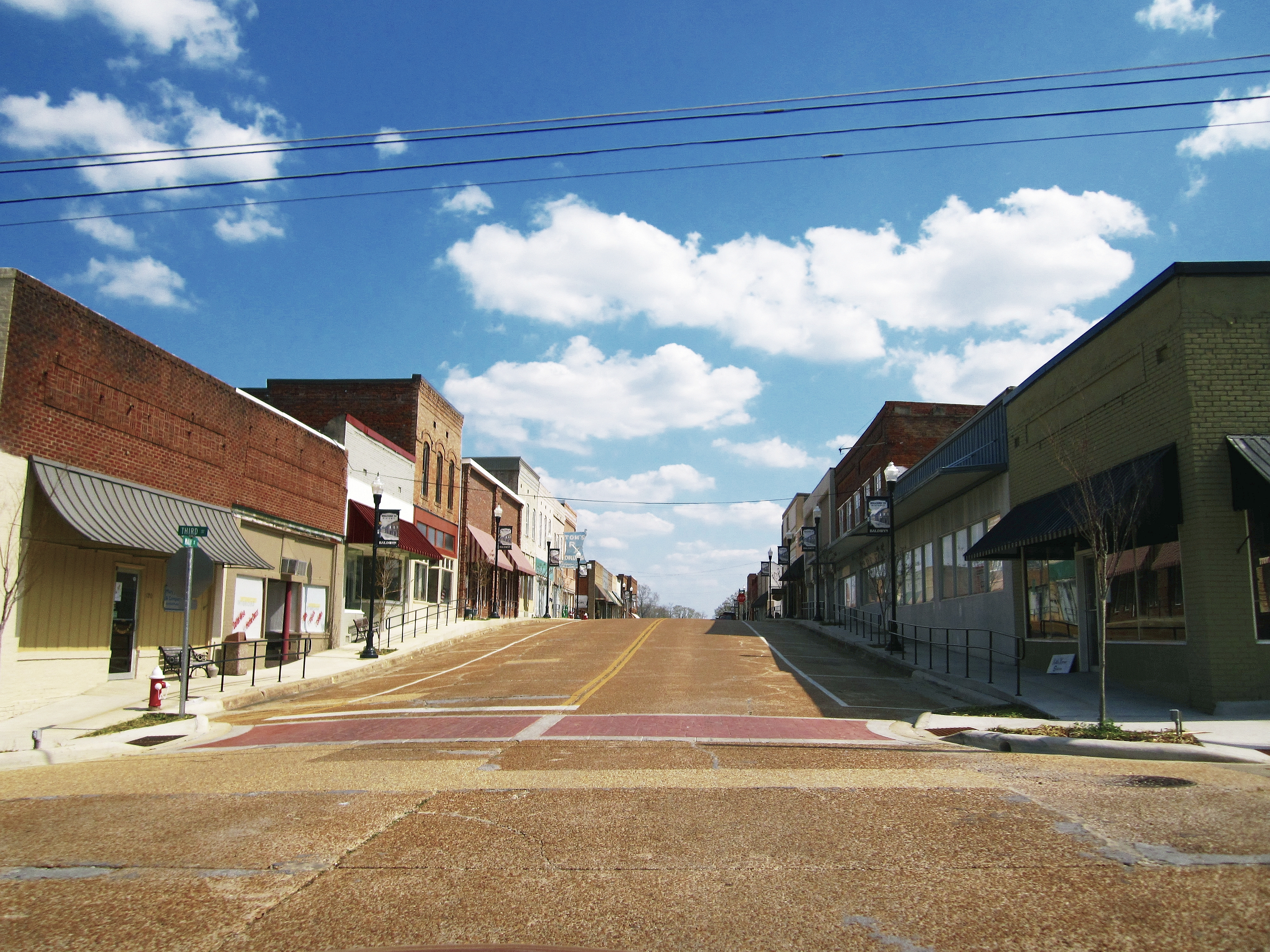
- Downtown Baldwyn

- Flag Seal
- Motto: "A city on the move"
- Location in Lee County and Mississippi

- Location in the United States
- Coordinates: 34°30′12″N 88°38′02″W
- Country: United States
- State: Mississippi
- Counties: Lee; Prentiss
- Founded: November 20, 1860
- Chartered: April 1, 1861

Government
  - Type: Mayor–Council
  - Mayor: Roslynn Clark (I)
  - Council: Board of Aldermen

Area
  - Total: 11.64 sq mi (30.15 km^{2})
  - Land: 11.59 sq mi (30.03 km^{2})
  - Water: 0.046 sq mi (0.12 km^{2})
- Elevation: 374 ft (114 m)

Population (2020)
  - Total: 3,071
  - Density: 264.9/sq mi (102.27/km^{2})
- Time zone: UTC−06:00 (CST)
  - Summer (DST): UTC−05:00 (CDT)
- ZIP code(s): 38824, 38849
- Area code(s): 662
- FIPS code: 28-02700
- GNIS feature ID: 2403150
- Highways: U.S. Highway 45; Highway 145; Highway 370
- Major airport: Memphis Airport (MEM)
- Website: Official website

Baldwyn, officially the City of Baldwyn, is a city in Lee and Prentiss counties, Mississippi, United States. It is located in the northern part of the Tupelo micropolitan area. Founded in 1860, the population was 3,071 at the 2020 census.

== History ==
Located five miles north of Guntown, the main street of Baldwyn runs along the county line of Lee and Prentiss counties. It has the unusual distinction of having been incorporated in four counties. Founded on November 20, 1860, it was incorporated by an act of the Legislature in Tishomingo and Itawamba counties on April 1, 1861. Lee county was formed from parts of Itawamba and Pontotoc on October 26, 1866, while Tishomingo was divided into Alcorn, Prentiss, and Tishomingo on April 15, 1870.

Baldwyn is an outgrowth of the village of Carrollville. The Mobile and Ohio Railroad was built through the site of Baldwyn around November 1860. It missed Carrollville by one and one-half miles and the citizens moved to the new town of Baldwyn, which was named for the civil engineer who surveyed the road through the town. Tishomingo, chief of the Chickasaw nation, lived at Carrollville but died near Little Rock, Arkansas, in 1839 of smallpox while being moved west with his tribe.

== Geography ==
In the 2000 census, 1,892 of the city's 3,321 residents (57.0%) lived in Prentiss county and 1,429 (43.0%) in Lee county. According to the U.S. Census Bureau, the city has a total area of 11.6 square miles (30 km^{2}), of which 11.5 square miles (30 km^{2}) is land and 0.1 square miles (0.26 km^{2}) (0.43%) is water.

== Demographics ==
Historical population
Census	Pop.	Note	%±
1870	133		—
1880	477		258.6%
1900	560		—
1910	787		40.5%
1920	922		17.2%
1930	1,106		20.0%
1940	1,279		15.6%
1950	1,567		22.5%
1960	2,023		29.1%
1970	2,366		17.0%
1980	3,427		44.8%
1990	3,204		−6.5%
2000	3,321		3.7%
2010	3,297		−0.7%
2020	3,071		−6.9%
U.S. Decennial Census

=== 2020 census ===
As of the 2020 census, Baldwyn had a population of 3,071. The median age was 39.9 years. 23.2% of residents were under the age of 18 and 18.5% were 65 years of age or older. For every 100 females, there were 89.5 males, and for every 100 females age 18 and over there were 80.9 males age 18 and over.

0.0% of residents lived in urban areas, while 100.0% lived in rural areas.

There were 1,294 households in Baldwyn, of which 33.0% had children under the age of 18 living in them. Of all households, 36.3% were married-couple households, 16.9% were households with a male householder and no spouse or partner present, and 40.2% were households with a female householder and no spouse or partner present. About 32.6% of all households were made up of individuals, and 13.3% had someone living alone who was 65 years of age or older.

There were 1,468 housing units, of which 11.9% were vacant. The homeowner vacancy rate was 2.2% and the rental vacancy rate was 10.9%.

Racial composition as of the 2020 census
Race	Number	Percent
White	1,521	49.5%
Black or African American	1,446	47.1%
American Indian and Alaska Native	6	0.2%
Asian	11	0.4%
Native Hawaiian and Other Pacific Islander	1	0.0%
Some other race	12	0.4%
Two or more races	74	2.4%
Hispanic or Latino (of any race)	30	1.0%

=== 2000 census ===
As of the census of 2000, there were 3,321 people, 1,331 households, and 886 families residing in the city. The population density was 287.9 sq mi). There were 1,472 housing units at an average density of 127.6 per square mile. The racial makeup of the city was 54.53% White, 43.87% African American, 0.24% Native American, 0.30% from other races, and 1.05% from two or more races. Hispanic or Latino of any race were 0.99% of the population.

There were 1,331 households, out of which 33.1% had children under the age of 18 living with them, 42.2% were married couples living together, 20.2% had a female householder with no husband present, and 33.4% were non-families. 31.5% of all households were made up of individuals, and 15.7% had someone living alone who was 65 years of age or older. The average household size was 2.42 and the average family size was 3.02.

In the city, the population was spread out, with 26.8% under the age of 18, 9.7% from 18 to 24, 24.1% from 25 to 44, 21.4% from 45 to 64, and 18.0% who were 65 years of age or older. The median age was 36 years. For every 100 females, there were 79.9 males. For every 100 females age 18 and over, there were 73.5 males.

The median income for a household in the city was $26,016, and the median income for a family was $37,598. Males had a median income of $27,162 versus $21,174 for females. The per capita income for the city was $15,430. About 19.9% of families and 24.0% of the population were below the poverty line, including 32.9% of those under age 18 and 23.3% of those age 65 or over.

== Education ==
Baldwyn is served by the Baldwyn School District.

== Infrastructure ==
The Booneville/Baldwyn Airport is owned by the cities of Booneville and Baldwyn. It is located in Prentiss county, six nautical miles (6.9 mi; 11 km) southwest of Booneville's central business district.

== Notable people ==
- R. H. Allen (1840–1895), Mississippi state senator (1872–1880)
- Dorothy Vredenburgh Bush (1916–1991), secretary of the Democratic National Committee from 1944 to 1980
- Elijah Allen Cox (1887–1974), United States district judge of the United States District Court for the Northern District of Mississippi from 1929 to 1974
- Tim Ford (1951–2015), Speaker of the Mississippi House of Representatives from 1988 to 2004
- Babe McCarthy (1923–1975), American professional and collegiate basketball coach
- Laura Pendergest-Holt (born 1973), convicted Ponzi scheme artist, financier, and former Chief Investment Officer of Stanford Financial Group
- Elijah Pierce (1892–1984), American woodcarver
- Paul A. G. Stewart (born 1941), 50th Bishop of the Christian Methodist Episcopal (C.M.E.) Church
- W. H. H. Tison (1822–1882), 39th speaker of the Mississippi House of Representatives. Murdered while in office in downtown Baldwyn.

== See also ==
- Brices Cross Roads National Battlefield Site
- List of municipalities in Mississippi
- National Register of Historic Places listings in Lee County, Mississippi
