= Stewart-Anderson House =

- Stewart--Anderson House
- U.S. National Register of Historic Places
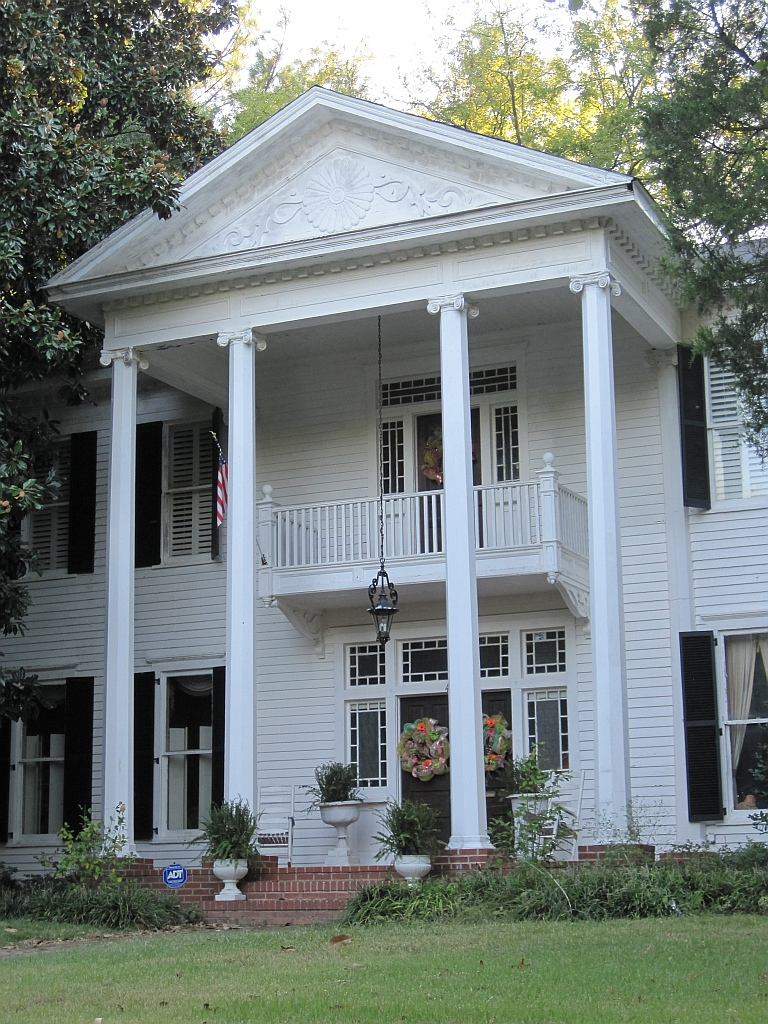
- The facade in 2011

- Location within Mississippi
- Location: 433 North Church Street, Tupelo, Mississippi
- Coordinates: 34°15′45″N 88°42′34″W
- Area: 1 acre (0.40 ha)
- Built: 1867
- Architectural style: Colonial Revival, Greek Revival
- MPS: Tupelo MPS
- NRHP reference No.: 94000644
- Added to NRHP: June 24, 1994

The Stewart-Anderson House is a historic mansion in Tupelo, Mississippi. It was built in 1867. It served as the Tupelo Female Academy and it later became the private residence of state representative and senator W. D. Anderson, who also served as the mayor of Tupelo from 1899 to 1907.

== History ==
The house was built circa 1867 for Dr Robert Stewart and his wife Mary Jane Stewart. From 1870 to 1884, the dining-room served as the Tupelo Female Academy, whose headmistress was Mrs Stewart. Her father, Thomas Stuart, moved into the house. A Presbyterian missionary, he was a co-founder of the Presbyterian church in Tupelo.

The house was purchased by W. D. Anderson, an attorney for the Mobile and Ohio Railroad, in 1887. Anderson served as a member of the Mississippi House of Representatives in 1898, and as the mayor of Tupelo from 1899 to 1907. He also served as member of the Mississippi Senate in 1907, and as a justice of the Mississippi Supreme Court from 1910 to 1911, and again from 1920 to 1945. Anderson died in 1952. The home was bought & refurbished by Dr. & Mrs. W. L. Kitchens in 1968.

== Architectural significance ==
The I-house was designed in the Greek Revival architectural style in the 1860s and remodelled in the Colonial Revival style circa 1900. It has been listed on the National Register of Historic Places since June 24, 1994.
