= Booneville/Baldwyn Airport =

Airport in Mississippi, US

- IATA: none; ICAO: none; FAA LID: 8M1

Summary
- Airport type: Public
- Owner: Cities of Booneville & Baldwyn
- Serves: Booneville / Baldwyn, Mississippi
- Elevation AMSL: 384 ft (117 m)
- Coordinates: 34°35′31″N 088°38′55″W
- Interactive map of Booneville/Baldwyn Airport

Runways
Direction	Length		Surface
Direction	ft	m	Surface
15/33	5,000	1,524	Asphalt

Statistics (2010)
- Aircraft operations: 11,500
- Based aircraft: 9
- Source: Federal Aviation Administration

Booneville/Baldwyn Airport (FAA LID: 8M1) is a public use airport in Prentiss County, Mississippi, United States. It is owned by the cities of Booneville and Baldwyn, and located six nautical miles (6.9 mi; 11 km) southwest of the central business district of Booneville. This airport is included in the FAA's National Plan of Integrated Airport Systems for 2011–2015, which categorized it as a general aviation facility.

== Facilities and aircraft ==
Booneville/Baldwyn Airport covers an area of 62 acres (25 ha) at an elevation of 384 feet (117 m) above mean sea level. It has one runway designated 15/33 with an asphalt surface measuring 5,000 by 75 feet (1,524 by 23 m).

For the 12-month period ending October 5, 2010, the airport had 11,500 aircraft operations, an average of 31 per day: 90% general aviation and 10% military. At that time there were 9 aircraft based at this airport: 89% single-engine and 11% multi-engine.

== See also ==
- List of airports in Mississippi
