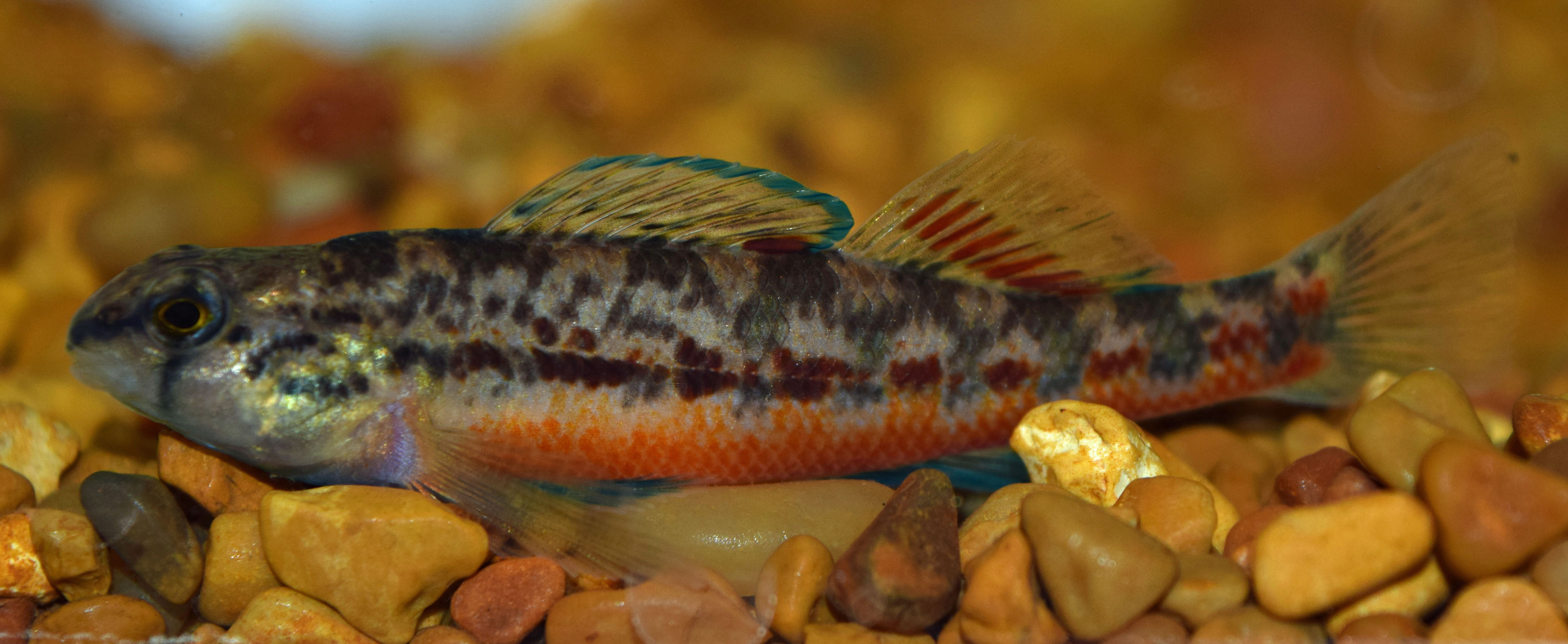
- Adult male in breeding coloration

Conservation status
- Near Threatened (IUCN 3.1)

Scientific classification
- Kingdom: Animalia
- Phylum: Chordata
- Class: Actinopterygii
- Division: Teleostei
- Order: Perciformes
- Family: Percidae
- Genus: Etheostoma
- Species: E. raneyi

Binomial name
- Etheostoma raneyi Suttkus & Bart, 1994

= Yazoo darter =

Species of fish

The Yazoo darter (Etheostoma raneyi) is a species of freshwater ray-finned fish, a darter from the subfamily Etheostomatinae, part of the family Percidae, which also contains the perches, ruffes and pikeperches. It is endemic to north-central Mississippi in the United States, where it is found only in tributaries of the Little Tallahatchie River.

== Description ==
Yazoo darters grow up to 65 millimetres (2.6 in) standard length. Males are slightly larger than females and are brightly colored when breeding.

== Distribution and habitat ==
The Yazoo darter inhabits small, clear, mostly spring-fed streams with substrates that include clay, sand, gravel, or silt. Its range encompasses headwater streams in the Little Tallahatchie River's watershed, including the Tippah River and Cypress Creek. The range includes Benton, Lafayette, Marshall, Tate, Tippah, and Union counties and parts of Holly Springs National Forest.

Prior to 2020, populations in the Yocona River watershed were considered to be a unique clade of E. raneyi. Based on mitochondrial DNA, it was initially determined that there are two monophyletic clades, those in the Little Tallahatchie River and those in the Yocona River drainages. Further genetic and morphological analyses determined the two populations were different species, with E. raneyi in the Little Tallahatchie River watershed, while the population in the Yocona River watershed was described as a new species, E. faulkneri.

== Behavior ==
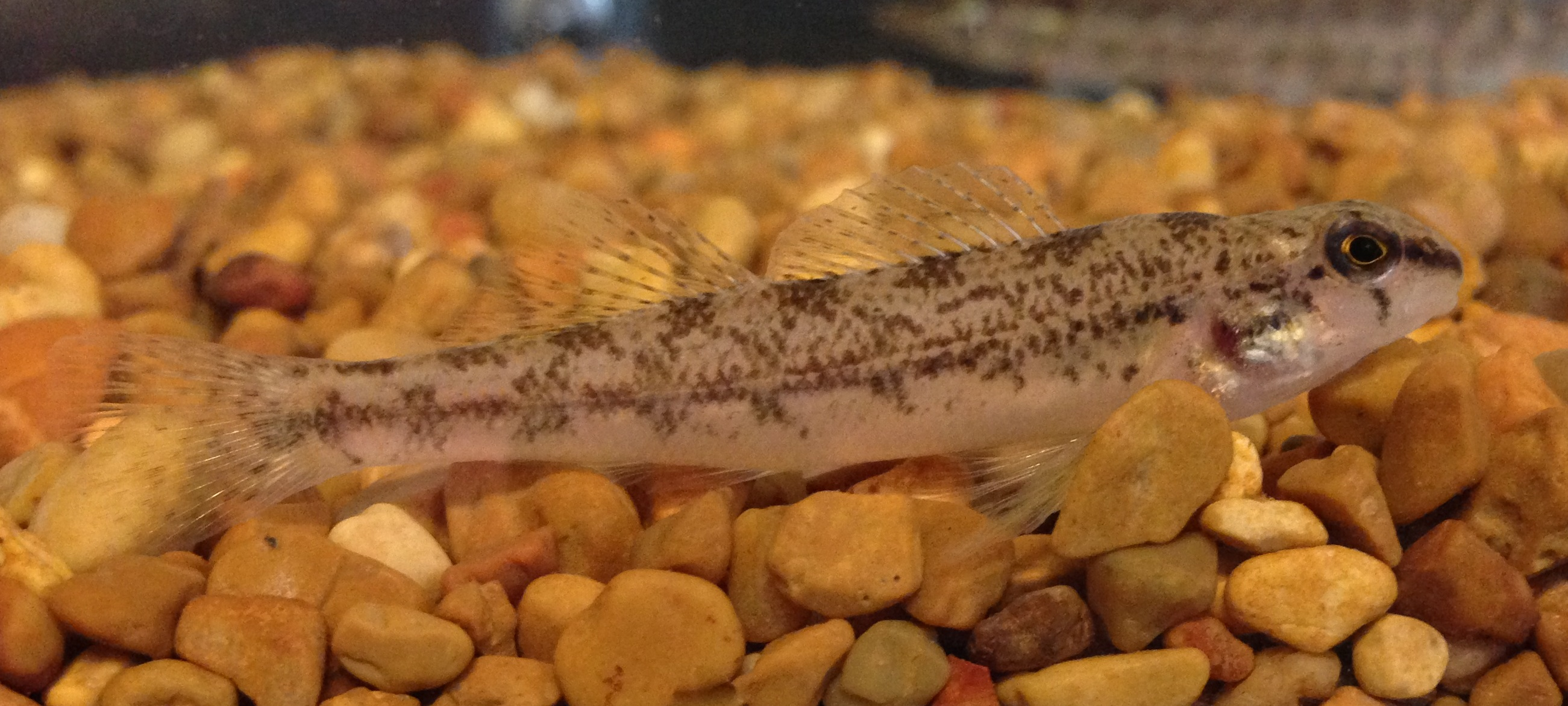
Adult female

Most individuals do not survive past their first year, and few individuals survive more than two years. Individuals primarily eat insects.

== Status ==
Stream channelization and urbanization, particularly culverts have led to range restriction and declining populations of the Yazoo darter. The species is listed as near-threatened by the International Union for Conservation of Nature, sensitive by the United States Forest Service, globally imperiled by The Nature Conservancy, and vulnerable by the Southeastern Fisheries Council and American Fisheries Society.

== Taxonomy and etymology ==
The Yazoo darter was first formally described in 1994 by Royal Dallas Suttkus and Henry L. Bart with the type locality given as Hurricane Creek, a tributary to Tallahatchie River in the Yazoo River drainage, at Mississippi Highway 7 in Lafayette County, Mississippi. The specific name honors the American ichthyologist Edward Cowden Raney (1909–1984) of Cornell University.
