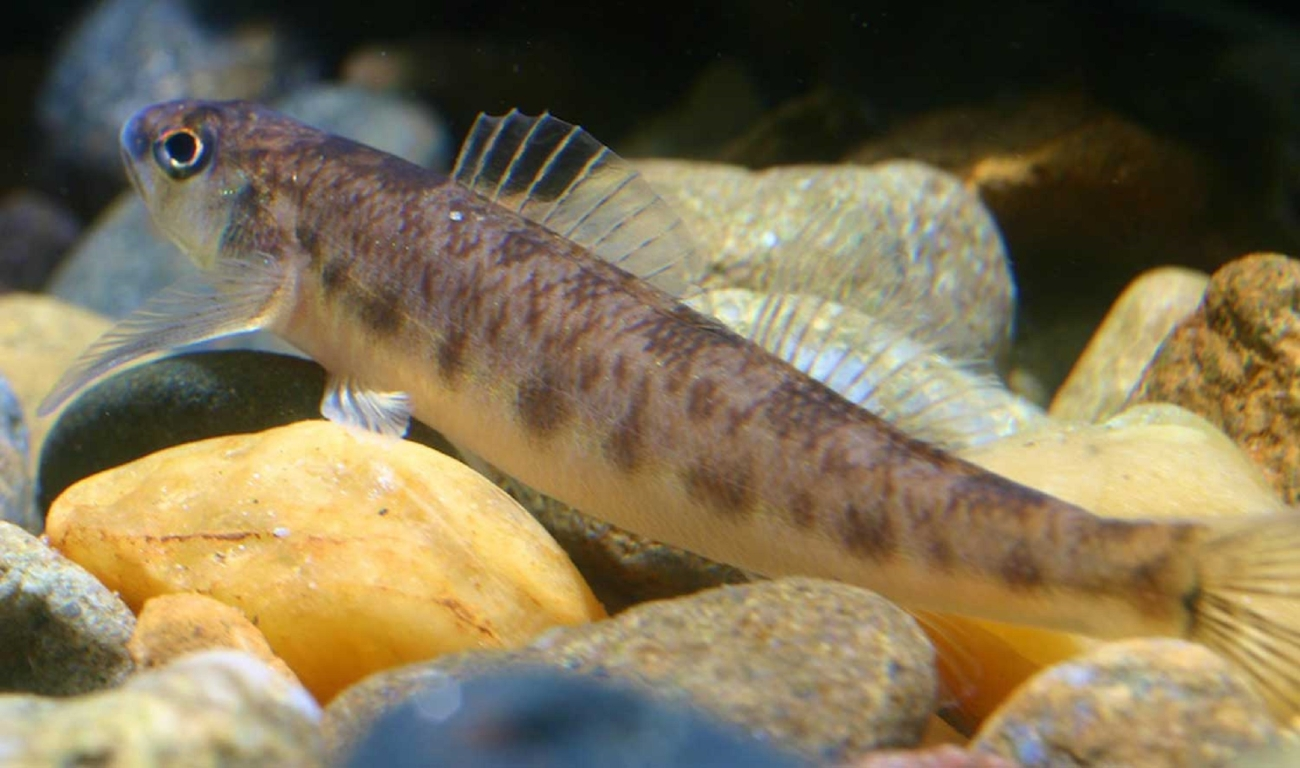

Conservation status
- Endangered (IUCN 3.1)

Scientific classification
- Kingdom: Animalia
- Phylum: Chordata
- Class: Actinopterygii
- Order: Perciformes
- Family: Percidae
- Genus: Percina
- Species: P. aurora

Binomial name
- Percina aurora Suttkus & B. A. Thompson, 1994

= Percina aurora =

Species of fish

Percina aurora, the pearl darter is a small species of freshwater ray-finned fish, a darter from the subfamily Etheostomatinae, part of the family Percidae, which also contains the perches, ruffes and pikeperches. It is native to the United States, where it is known only from Louisiana and Mississippi, but seems no longer to be present in the Pearl River. Its total area of occupation is under 200 km^{2} (77 mi^{2}), it is a rare species and a candidate for federal protection. It is threatened by siltation, pollution, habitat destruction and urbanization, and as a result, the International Union for Conservation of Nature has classified its conservation status as being "endangered".

== Description ==
This fish was described as a species in 1994. It had previously been included in Percina copelandi.

Female pearl darters grow up to 57 millimetres (2.2 inches) and males up to 64 millimetres (2.5 inches) long. It has a black spot at the base of the tail fin. The breeding male has a few dark bands. It is usually mature around one year of age.

== Distribution and habitat ==
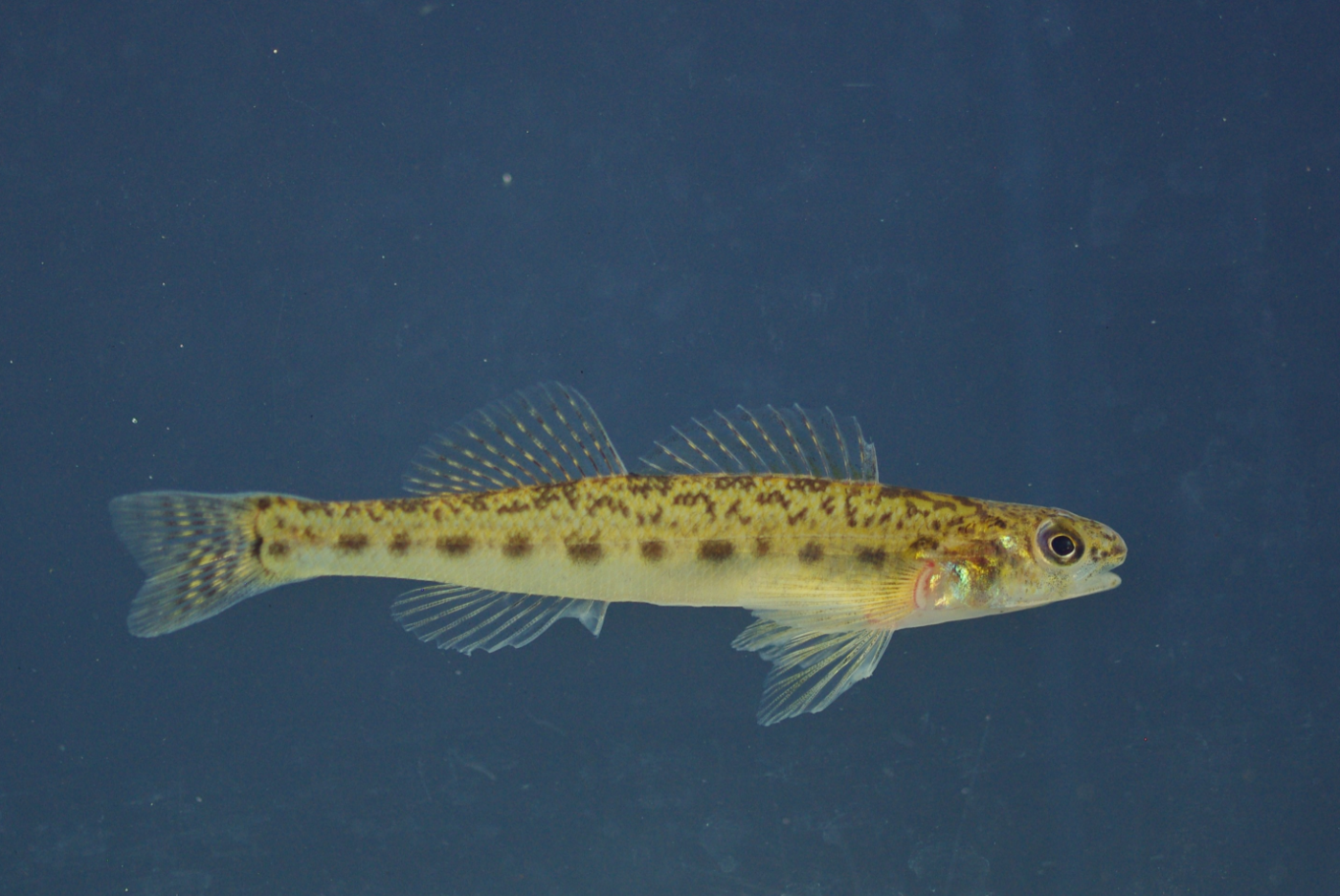

This fish is now limited to the Pascagoula River drainage basin in Louisiana and Mississippi in the United States. It has apparently been extirpated from the Pearl River. The total range is about 200 square kilometres (77 square miles).

This fish can be found in riffles and shallow, fast-moving river water. Higher river flows in the spring help to disperse the juveniles. Its favored habitat is unknown but its habitat requirements are likely similar to those of P. copelandi. This related species feeds on midges and small crustaceans.

Threats to this species include pollution via runoff of fertilizers, pesticides, oil, and other materials. Sediment and silt degrade the habitat. Hurricane Katrina affected the local area, washing pollutants and salt water into the river. The release of dioxins into the Pascagoula system has been mitigated, but dioxins embedded in the substrate may be stirred up at times, entering the water. Riverside urbanization may lead to organic wastes being released into the water. Sand and gravel mining occur in the river system and destabilize the substrate. Habitat destruction has led to the species' populations being split and isolated, creating a disjunct distribution. This split makes it more likely that populations will become extirpated.
