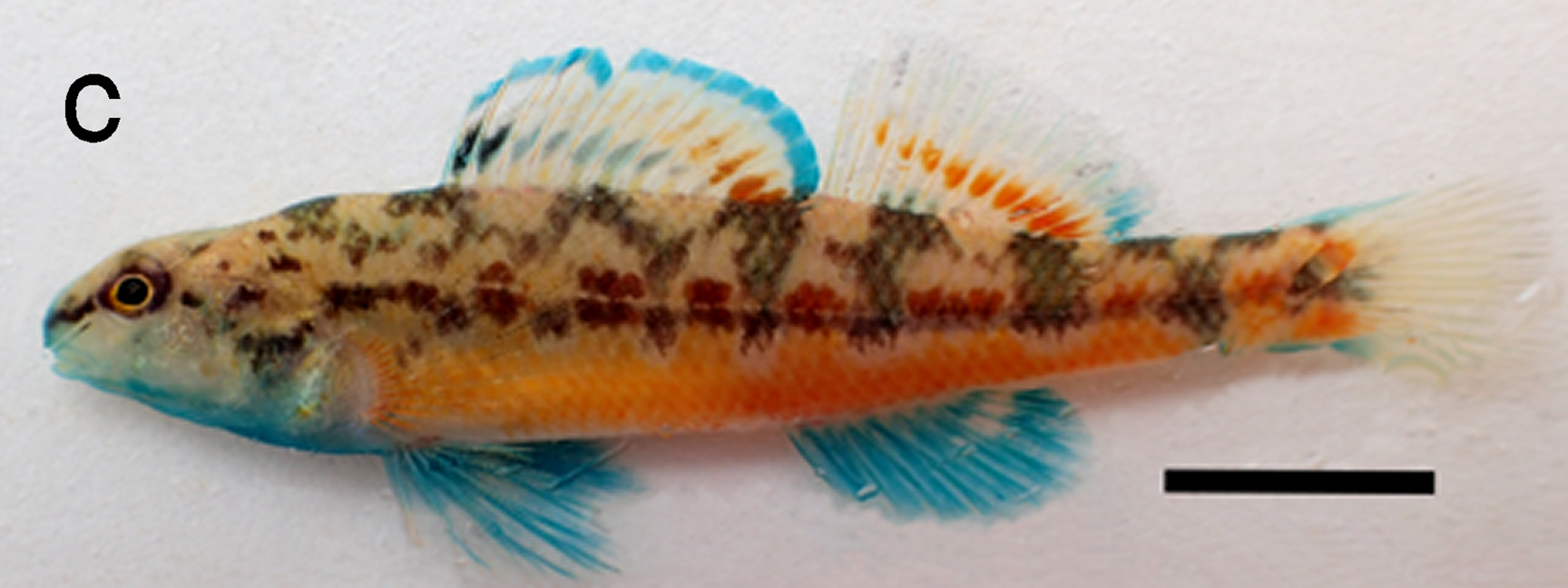
- E. faulkneri male
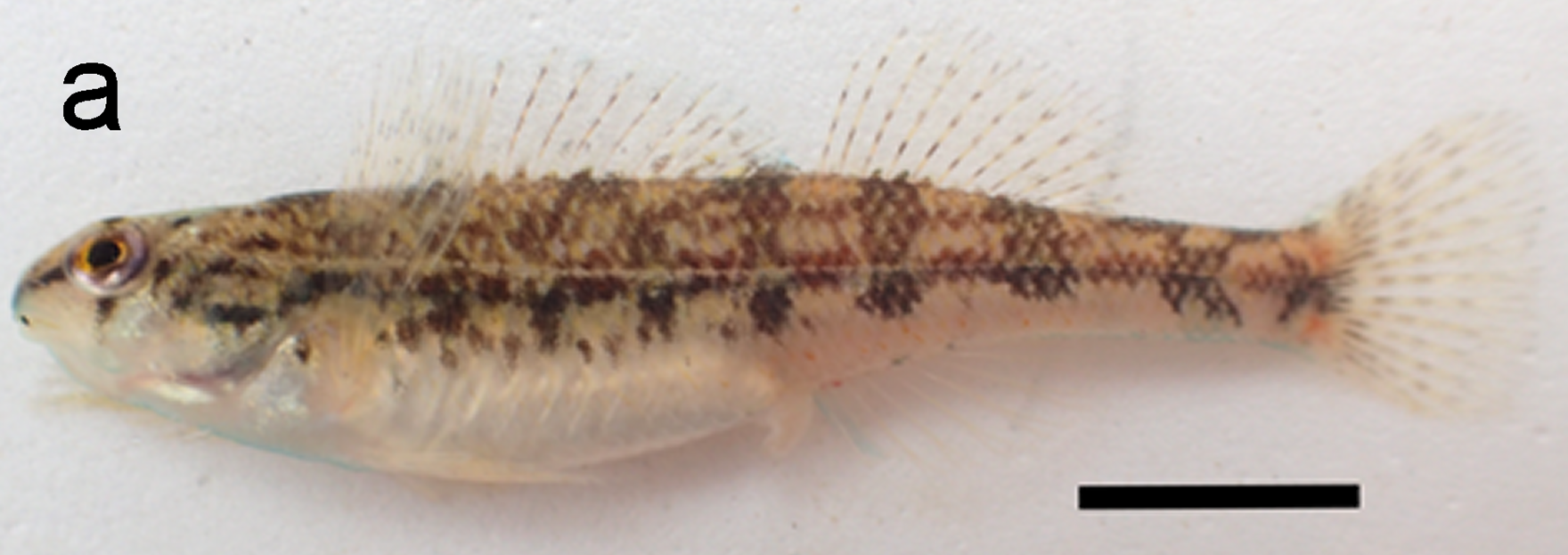
- E. faulkneri female

Conservation status
- Imperiled (NatureServe)

Scientific classification
- Kingdom: Animalia
- Phylum: Chordata
- Class: Actinopterygii
- Order: Perciformes
- Family: Percidae
- Genus: Etheostoma
- Species: E. faulkneri

Binomial name
- Etheostoma faulkneri Sterling & Warren 2020

= Etheostoma faulkneri =

Species of fish

The Yoknapatawpha darter (Etheostoma faulkneri) is a species of freshwater ray-finned fish, a darter from the subfamily Etheostomatinae, part of the family Percidae. It is endemic to the Yocona River watershed of north-central Mississippi in the United States.

The Yoknapatawpha darter was initially considered to be a unique clade of the Yazoo darter. Based on mitochondrial DNA, it was initially determined that there are two monophyletic clades, those in the Little Tallahatchie River and those in the Yocona River drainages. Further genetic and morphological analyses determined the two populations were different species, with E. raneyi in the Little Tallahatchie River watershed, while the population in the Yocona River watershed was described as a new species, E. faulkneri.

== Description ==
Yoknapatawpha darters grow up to 64 millimetres (2.5 in) standard length (males) and 49 millimetres (1.9 in) (females).

== Distribution and habitat ==
The Yoknapatawpha darter inhabits small, clear, mostly spring-fed streams with substrates that include clay, sand, gravel, or silt. Its range encompasses headwater streams in the Yocona River's watershed, in Lafayette, Yalobusha, and Calhoun counties; it may also occur in southwestern Panola County.

== Taxonomy and etymology ==
Etheostoma faulkneri is named for William Faulkner, a native of Lafayette County, Mississippi. The common name, the Yoknapatawpha darter, is derived from the fictional name given to the Yocona River by Faulkner.
