= John Mills Allen =

American politician (1846–1917)

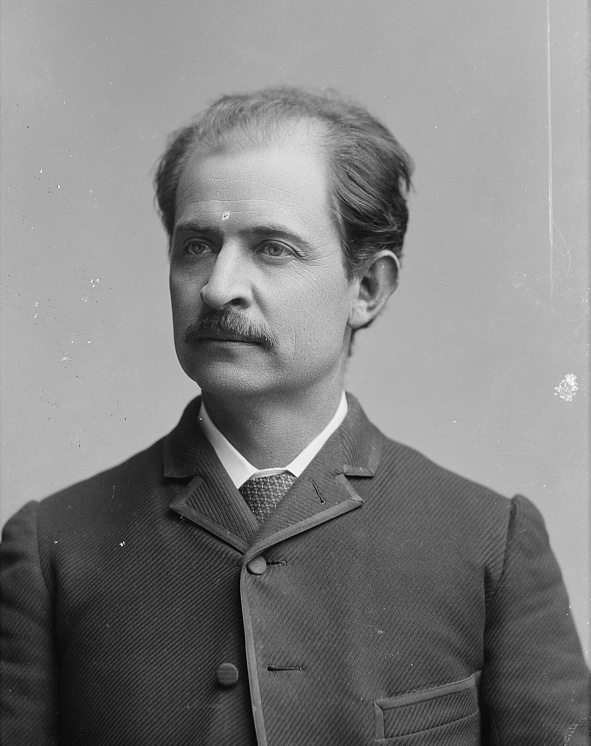
- Allen, photographed by C. M. Bell

Member of the U.S. House of Representatives from Mississippi's 1st district
- In office March 4, 1885 – March 3, 1901
- Preceded by: Henry Muldrow
- Succeeded by: Ezekiel S. Candler, Jr.

Personal details
- Born: July 8, 1846 Tishomingo County, Mississippi, U.S.
- Died: October 30, 1917 (aged 71) Tupelo, Mississippi, U.S.
- Party: Democratic
- Occupation: Attorney

John Mills Allen (July 8, 1846 – October 30, 1917), known as "Private John" Allen, was an American lawyer and Confederate soldier during the American Civil War. He was also a member of the United States House of Representatives from Mississippi for eight consecutive terms from 1885 to 1901.

== Biography ==
=== Early life ===
Allen was born in Tishomingo County, Mississippi on July 8, 1846. He was the son of David M. Allen (1810–1875), a planter from Henry County, Virginia, and his wife, Sallie A. (Spencer) Allen (1815– ? ), also born in Henry County. John's older brother, Robert, served in the Mississippi Legislature in the 1870s.

Allen attended common schools, enlisted as a private in the Confederate States Army during the American Civil War (1861–1865), and served throughout the war. Allen also attended Cumberland School of Law in Lebanon, Tennessee, and graduated from the law department of the University of Mississippi in 1870. Allen was admitted to the bar the same year and commenced practice in Tupelo, Mississippi.

Allen served as district attorney for the first judicial district of Mississippi from 1875 to 1879. In 1880, he was elected county prosecuting attorney.

=== U.S. Congress ===
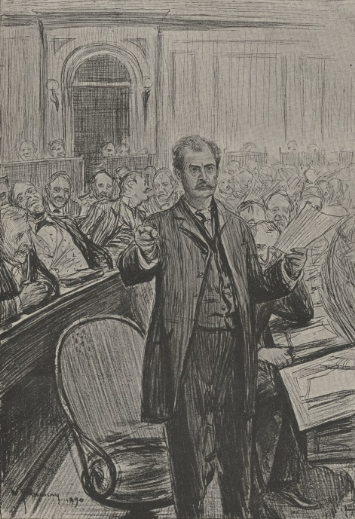
"Mr. Allen, of Mississippi, Has the Floor" — an illustration by William Thomas Smedley depicting John Mills "Private John" Allen entertaining his fellow congressmen with his wit, published in Harper's Weekly on July 19, 1890.

Allen was elected as a Democrat to the 49th United States Congress and to the seven succeeding Congresses (March 4, 1885 – March 3, 1901). He gained the nickname "Private John" Allen campaigning for Congress: He was a private throughout the American Civil War and proud of it. In one campaign he ran against a former general. He said that everyone who served as a general in the Civil War should vote for the general, " . . . and all of you who were privates and stood guard over the generals while they slept, vote for Private John Allen!" Allen won in a landslide and was thereafter known as "Private John" Allen.

Allen served as chairman of the Committee of Expenditures in the Department of Justice during the 52nd United States Congress (March 4, 1891 – March 4, 1893), and of the Committee on Levees and Improvements of the Mississippi River during the 53rd United States Congress (March 4, 1893 – March 4, 1895).

Allen became known during his time in the House for the entertaining, tongue-in-cheek style in which he delivered speeches on serious subjects. He advocated the construction of a national fish hatchery in Tupelo, and on February 20, 1901, delivered his eloquent "Fish Hatchery Speech" before calling for the establishment of the hatchery and stating with mock seriousness that "Fish will travel overland for miles to get into the water we have at Tupelo. . .thousands and millions of unborn fish are clamoring to this Congress today for an opportunity to be hatched at the Tupelo hatchery." (Note: John Mills Allen's "Fish Hatchery Speech" was reprinted in its entirety on Pages 2510 through 2512 of the Congressional Record of March 7,1940) The speech has been described as "the most spontaneous burst of wit and humor ever heard on the floors of Congress." Shortly after Allen's speech, Congress passed legislation approving the construction of the Tupelo National Fish Hatchery, and President William McKinley signed the legislation establishing it later in 1901.

=== Later career and death ===
Allen declined to be a candidate for reelection in 1900 to the 57th United States Congress (March 4, 1901 – March 4, 1903). He was appointed in March 1901 as United States commissioner to the Louisiana Purchase Exposition, informally known as the St. Louis World's Fair, of 1904 in St. Louis, Missouri. Afterwards he resumed the practice of law in Tupelo and died there on October 30, 1917. He was interred in Glenwood Cemetery in Tupelo.

== Commemoration ==
In 1982 the Tupelo National Fish Hatchery was renamed the Private John Allen National Fish Hatchery in honor of Allen. A memorial to Allen including a bronze bust of him was unveiled on the hatchery grounds on March 14, 2018.

== Bibliography ==
- Faries, Clyde J. "The Rhetoric of Private John Allen." Ph.D. diss., University of Missouri, 1965; Gentry, Claude. Private John Allen: Gentleman, Statesman, Sage, Prophet. Baldwyn, Miss: The author, 1951.

U.S. House of Representatives
Preceded by Henry Muldrow	Member of the U.S. House of Representatives from Mississippi's 1st congressional district 1885-1901	Succeeded by Ezekiel S. Candler, Jr.
