= Texas Southern Lady Tigers basketball =

American college basketball team

2026–27 Texas Southern Lady Tigers basketball team
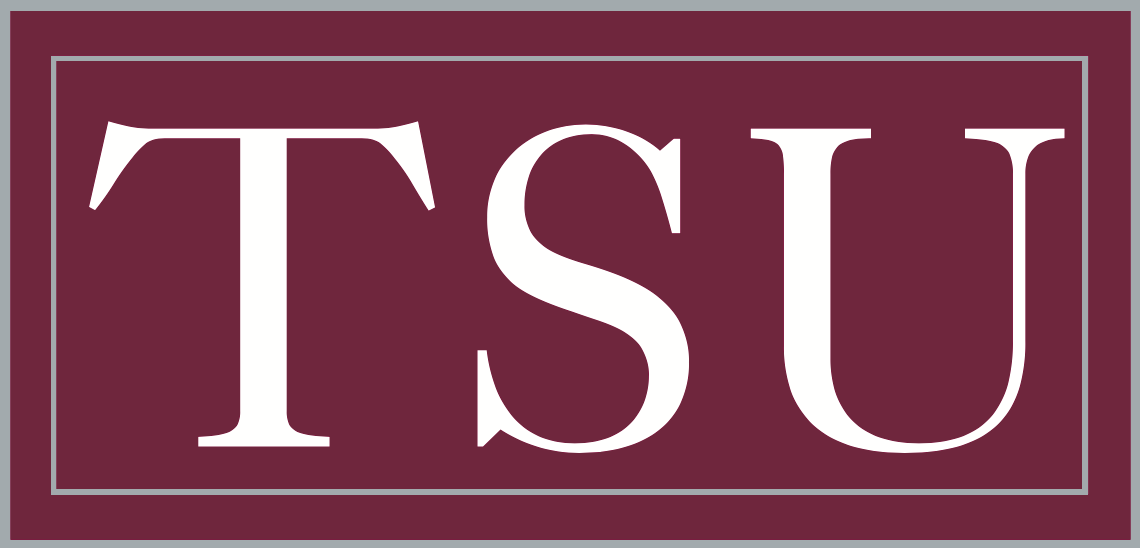
- University: Texas Southern University
- Head coach: Vernette Skeete (5th season)
- Location: Houston, Texas
- Arena: Health and Physical Education Arena (capacity: 8,100)
- Conference: SWAC
- Nickname: Lady Tigers
- Colors: Maroon and gray

NCAA Division I tournament appearances
- 2017

Conference tournament champions
- 2017

Conference regular-season champions
- 2017

The Texas Southern Lady Tigers basketball team is the women's basketball team that represents Texas Southern University in Houston, Texas, United States. The school's team currently competes in the Southwestern Athletic Conference. The Lady Tigers are led by head coach Vernette Skeete, entering her first year with the team.

== History ==
=== Coaches ===
Name	Seasons	Record
Nathaniel Gillespie	1981–1982	26–12
Brenda Johnson	1982–1984	25–29
Lusia Stewart	1984–1986	15–34
Robert Gatlin	1986–1993	82–109
Starlite Williams	1993–1996	6–71
Dwalah Brown-Fischer	1996–1997	7–26
Peggy Stapleton	1997–2001	37–74
Lacey Reynolds	2001–2003	16–39
Claude Cummings	2003–2008	34–100 (fired w/ 4 games left in the season)
Shiakiea Carter	2008 (interim)	0–4
Yolanda Wells-Broughton	2008–2012	33–88
Cynthia Cooper-Dyke	2012–2013, 2019–2022	20–12
Johnetta Hayes	2013–2019	39–24
Vernette Skeete	2022-Present	26–64

Records up to date through 25 March 2025

== Postseason results ==
=== NCAA Division I ===
Texas Southern has appeared in the NCAA Division I women's basketball tournament once. The Lady Tigers have a record of 0–1.

Year	Seed	Round	Opponent	Result
2017	#16	First round	#1 Baylor	L 30–119

=== WNIT ===
The Tigers have appeared in the Women's National Invitation Tournament (WNIT) three times. Their record is 0–3.

Year	Round	Opponent	Result
2013	First round	Kansas State	L 44–72
2014	First round	SMU	L 72–84
2015	First round	Southern Miss	L 79–69

=== NAIA ===
The Tigers made two appearances in the NAIA women's basketball tournament. Their record was 2–2.

Year	Seed	Round	Opponent	Result
1981	#1	First round Semifinals; National Championship	#8 Virginia State #5 Northern State (SD) #7 Kentucky State	W, 85–57; W, 76–58; L, 67–73
1982	#5	First round	#4 Saginaw Valley State	L, 58–65
