= North Broadway Historic District (Tupelo, Mississippi) =

Historic district in Mississippi, United States

- U.S. National Register of Historic Places
- U.S. Historic district
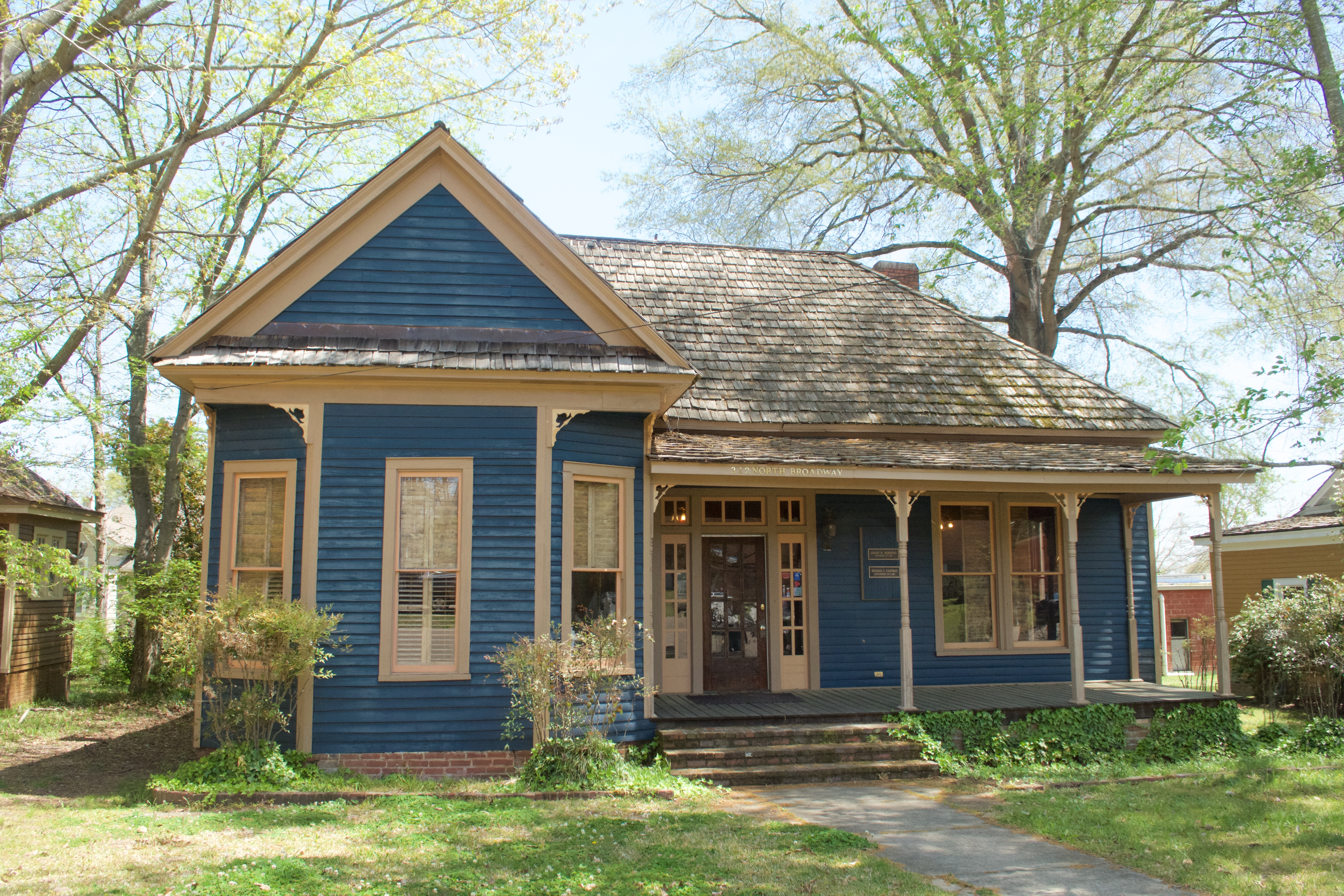
- 342 N. Broadway (c. 1900)

- Location within Mississippi Location within the United States
- Location: 300 block of N. Broadway St., Tupelo, Mississippi
- Coordinates: 34°15′37″N 88°42′20″W
- Area: 4 acres (1.6 ha)
- Architectural style: Colonial Revival, Bungalow/Craftsman, Queen Anne
- NRHP reference No.: 85003438
- Added to NRHP: October 31, 1985

The North Broadway Historic District in Tupelo, Mississippi, is a 4-acre (1.6 ha) historic district that was listed on the National Register of Historic Places in 1985.

The district consists of one block of North Broadway Street. In its NRHP nomination it was said to "represent a rare example of an intact late- nineteenth and early twentieth century Tupelo streetscape, in a community which saw most of its pre-1936 housing stock destroyed in a devastating tornado."

The district includes 13 properties, each with a wood-frame house. Eight of the houses were deemed to contribute significantly to the historic character of the district, while five contributed marginally.

The significantly contributing properties are:

- 308 Jefferson Street (c. 1895), a 2-story Queen Anne-style/Colonial Revival-style house with 2-story porches wrapping around two sides. The original first-floor wooden porch columns had been replaced by stucco-covered masonry. (See photo #1 of attached photos)
- 315 N. Broadway (c. 1895), an L-shaped vernacular cottage with East Lake-style woodwork on its front porch. (Photo #2)
- 323 N. Broadway (c. 1905), a 2-story structure with front porch supported by slender classical columns. A circular gazebo-like unit was once attached, but was removed. Has beveled siding. (Photo #3)
- 316 N. Broadway (c. 1900) a 1 1/2-story gable-front structure with chamfered corners at left side of facade. Its 1-story porch with turned columns is a replacement believed to be quite similar to the original. Photo #13
- 322 N. Broadway (c. 1900), a 1-story hipped-roof house (Note: The NRHP nomination uses the term foursquare in describing this house, but the usage of the term seems to refer to it having a hipped roof (which slopes four ways).) with a front-facing gable and a 1-story front porch supported by classical columns atop brick piers. This has Queen Anne-style textured woodwork inside its gable (photo #12).
- 330 N. Broadway (c. 1905), a 2-story structure with two front-facing gables. One-story porch supported by turned columns. Beveled siding. (photo #10)
- 342 N. Broadway (c. 1900), another L-shaped cottage, this with a projecting gable at left side of front facade that has chamfered corners with jig-sawn brackets. A c.1920 porch addition has square, classical piers on brick bases. Beveled siding. (photo #8)
- 346 N. Broadway (c. 1905), another L-shaped cottage, this with square, classical columns supporting its front porch. with beveled siding. (Photo #7)

The five marginal properties are:

- 326 N. Broadway (c. 1905), photo #11
- 336 N. Broadway (c. 1900), (photo #9)
- 354 N. Broadway (c. 1920), (Photo #6)
- 360 N. Broadway (c. 1915), (photo #5)and
- 364 N. Broadway (c. 1915). (photo #4)
