= Bears Bluff National Fish Hatchery =

Fish hatchery and park in South Carolina, United States

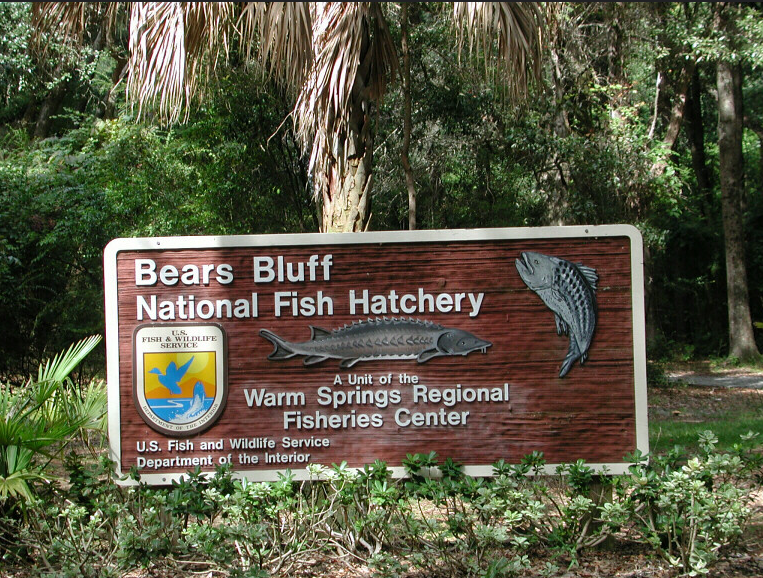

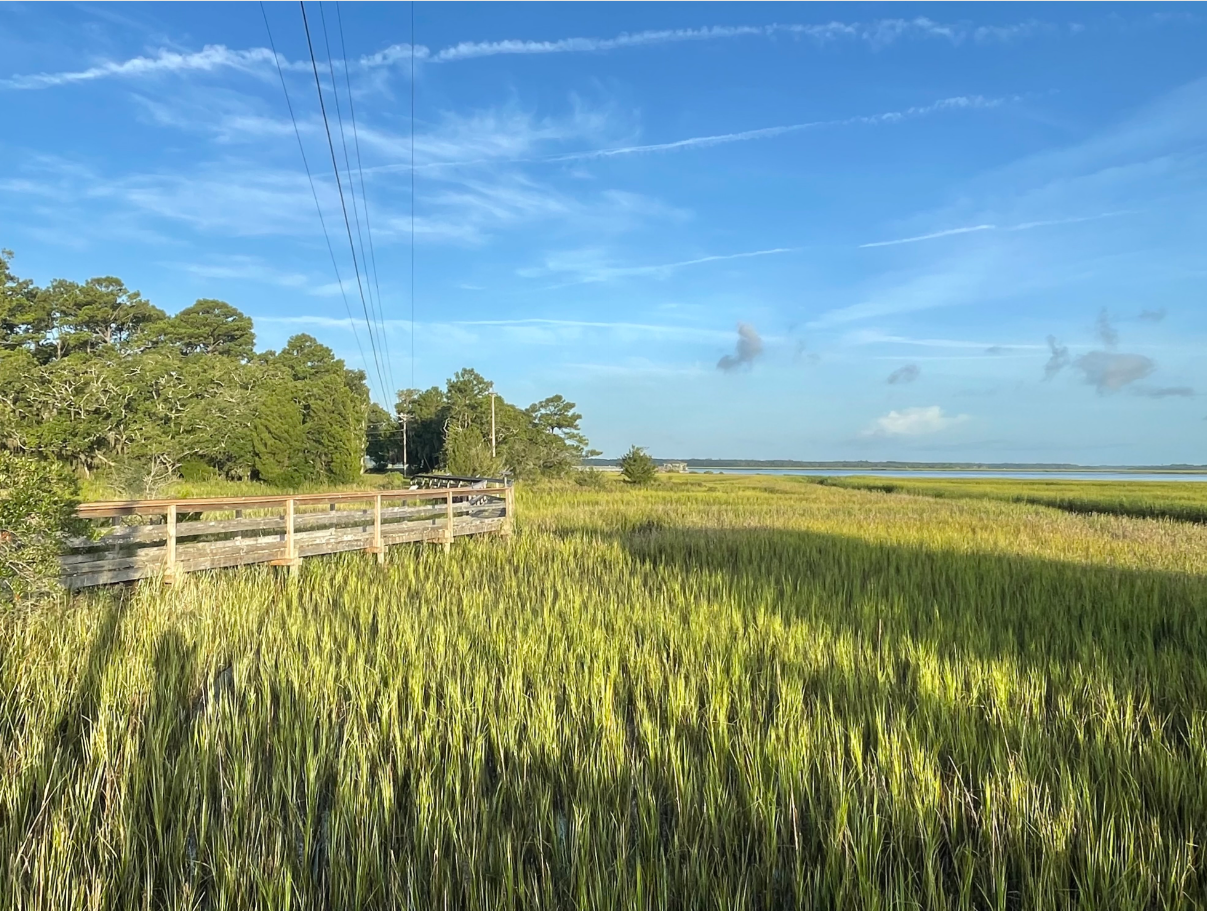
- A boardwalk through a salt marsh on the Bears Bluff Loop Trail at the Bears Bluff National Fish Hatchery.

- Location within South Carolina Location within the United States
- Location: Wadmalaw Island, South Carolina, United States
- Coordinates: 32°38′44″N 80°15′20″W
- Area: 31 acres (13 ha)
- Established: 1981
- Governing body: United States Fish and Wildlife Service
- Website: www.fws.gov/fish-hatchery/bears-bluff

The Bears Bluff National Fish Hatchery is a fish hatchery administered by the United States Fish and Wildlife Service located on Wadmalaw Island, one of the Sea Islands of South Carolina in the United States. The 31-acre (13-hectare) hatchery grounds lie in lowland forest and salt marsh environments on the shore of Wadmalaw Sound in the South Carolina Lowcountry in Charleston County. Like other components of the National Fish Hatchery System, the hatchery's mission is to conserve, protect, and enhance fish, wildlife, plants, and their habitats, as well to cooperate with like-minded partners to further these goals. The hatchery researches fresh-water, salt-water, and anadromous species of fish and ways of improving fish culture and propagation. It also raises other species of animals for release into the wild and plants for transplantation into natural ecosystems.

As of 2025, the hatchery lists its "featured species" as the Atlantic sturgeon (Acipenser oxyrinchus oxyrinchus), American shad (Alosa sapidissima), red drum (Sciaenops ocellatus), flathead catfish (Pylodictis olivaris), white catfish (Ameiurus catus), eastern oyster (Crassostrea virginica), Savannah lilliput (Toxolasma pullus), yellow lampmussel (Lampsilis cariosa), Carolina heelsplitter (Lasmigona decorata), Carolina gopher frog (Lithobates capito capito), American chaffseed (Schwalbea americana), smooth cordgrass (Sporobolus alterniflorus), and milkweed (genus Asclepias).

== Management ==
The United States Fish and Wildlife Service (USFWS) operates the Bears Bluff National Fish Hatchery. It is a part of the Warmwater Fisheries and Aquatic Conservation Program in the USFWS's South Atlantic–Gulf Region. In carrying out its activities, it partners with the South Carolina Department of Natural Resources, the National Oceanic and Atmospheric Administration's National Marine Fisheries Service, The Amphibian and Reptile Conservancy, Charleston County Parks and Recreation, The Nature Conservancy, and the Lowcountry Open Land Trust, as well as schools and private citizens.

== Activities ==
Bears Bluff National Fish Hatchery engages in aquaculture, conservation research, and habitat improvement. It is a warm-water production facility that cultures aquatic species year-round. It produces three species of fish — Atlantic sturgeon (Acipenser oxyrinchus oxyrinchus), American shad (Alosa sapidissima), and red drum (Sciaenops ocellatus) — as well as the Carolina gopher frog (Lithobates capito capito) and several species of freshwater mussel (order Bivalvia). It releases the American shad, red drum, and Carolina gopher frogs it raises in local habitats, while its work with the Atlantic sturgeon and freshwater mussels focuses on conservation research and the development of propagation and culture techniques. The hatchery's habitat improvement projects focus on ecosystems in salt marshes and fresh-water environments.

The hatchery has developed spawning techniques for Atlantic sturgeon that produce reliable spawns annually from captive fish. It is the only facility in the United States that raises Atlantic sturgeon, which it provides to scientists for research purposes and to conservation partners for public display to promote environmental awareness. As a result, many of the Atlantic sturgeon on display in zoos and public aquariums were raised at the hatchery.

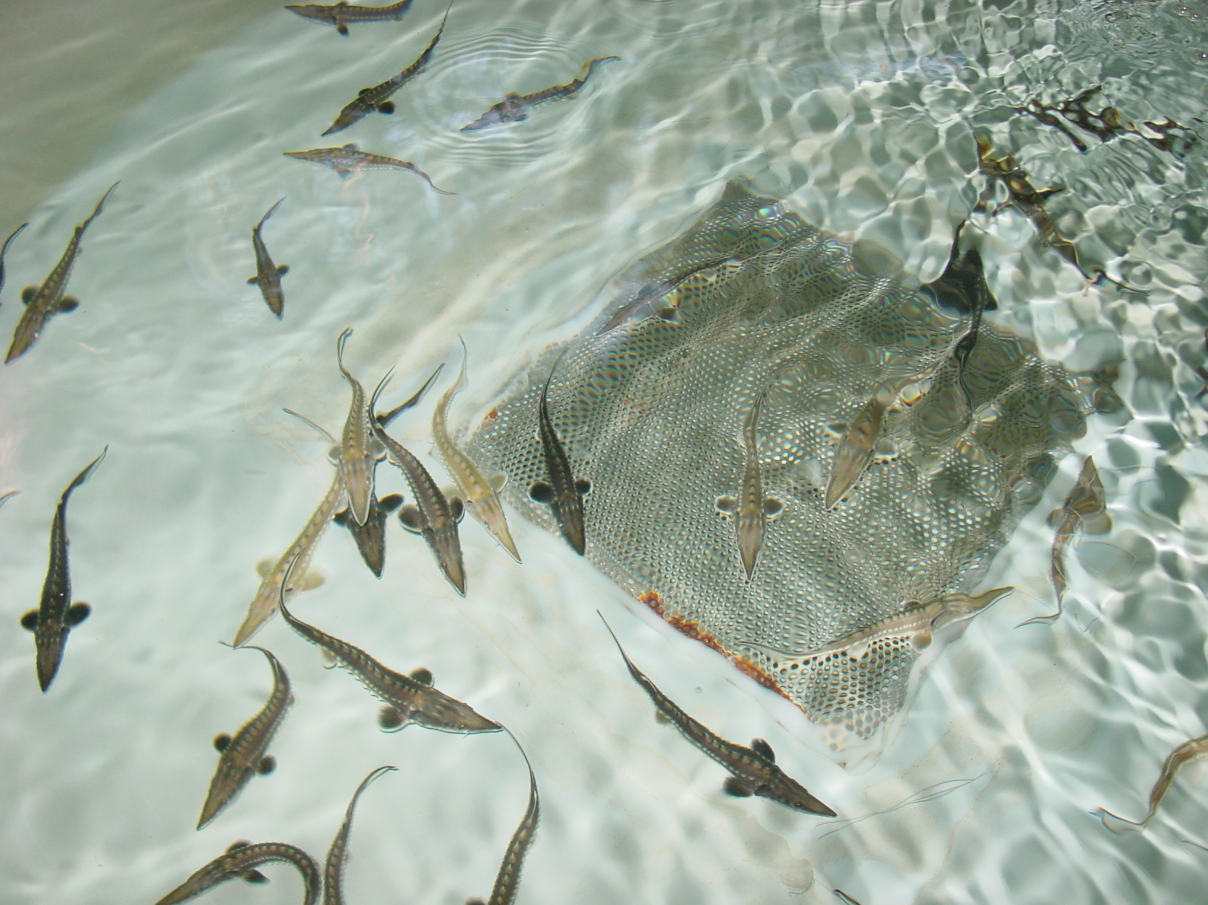
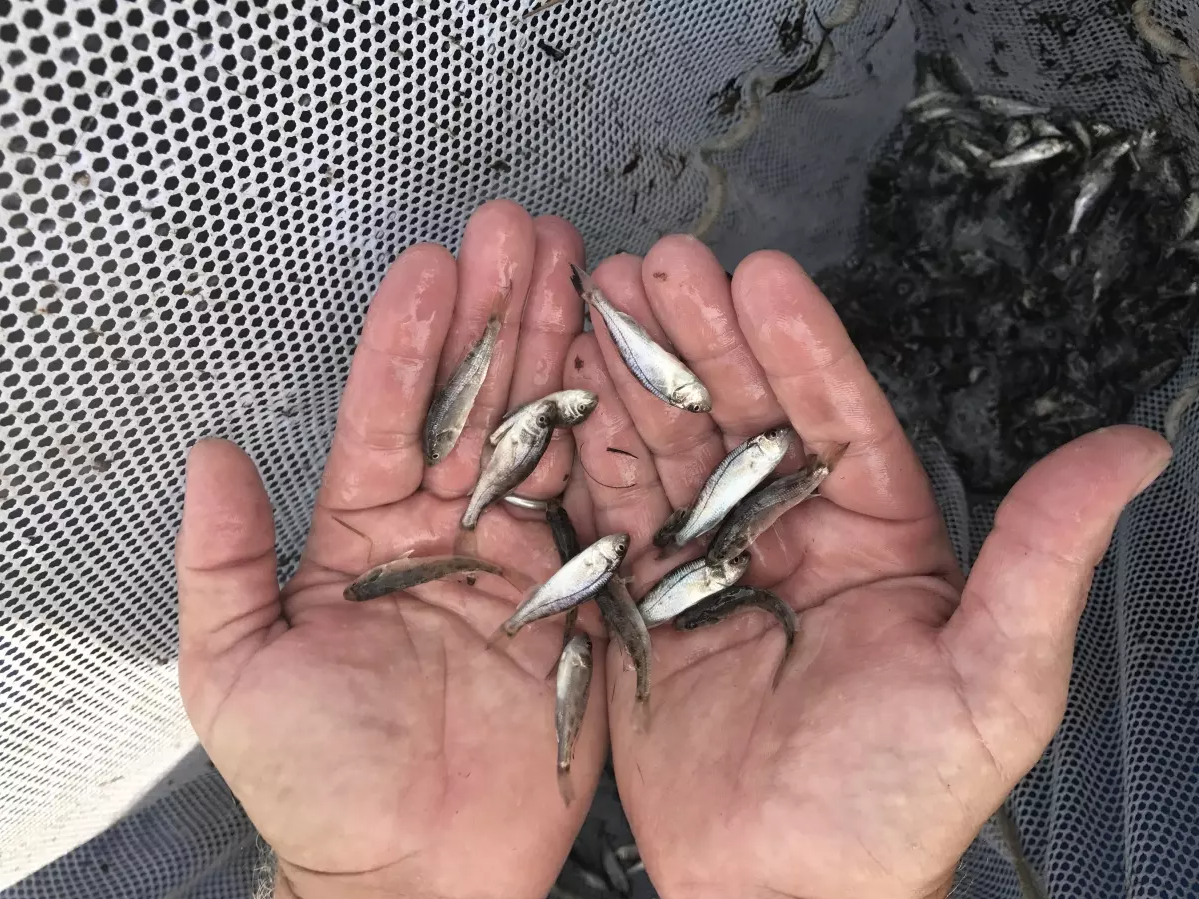
LEFT: Juvenile Atlantic sturgeon (Acipenser oxyrinchus oxyrinchus) swim in a tank at the hatchery in 2022.
RIGHT: Red drum (Sciaenops ocellatus) fingerlings raised at the hatchery in 2022. They are about 30 days old.
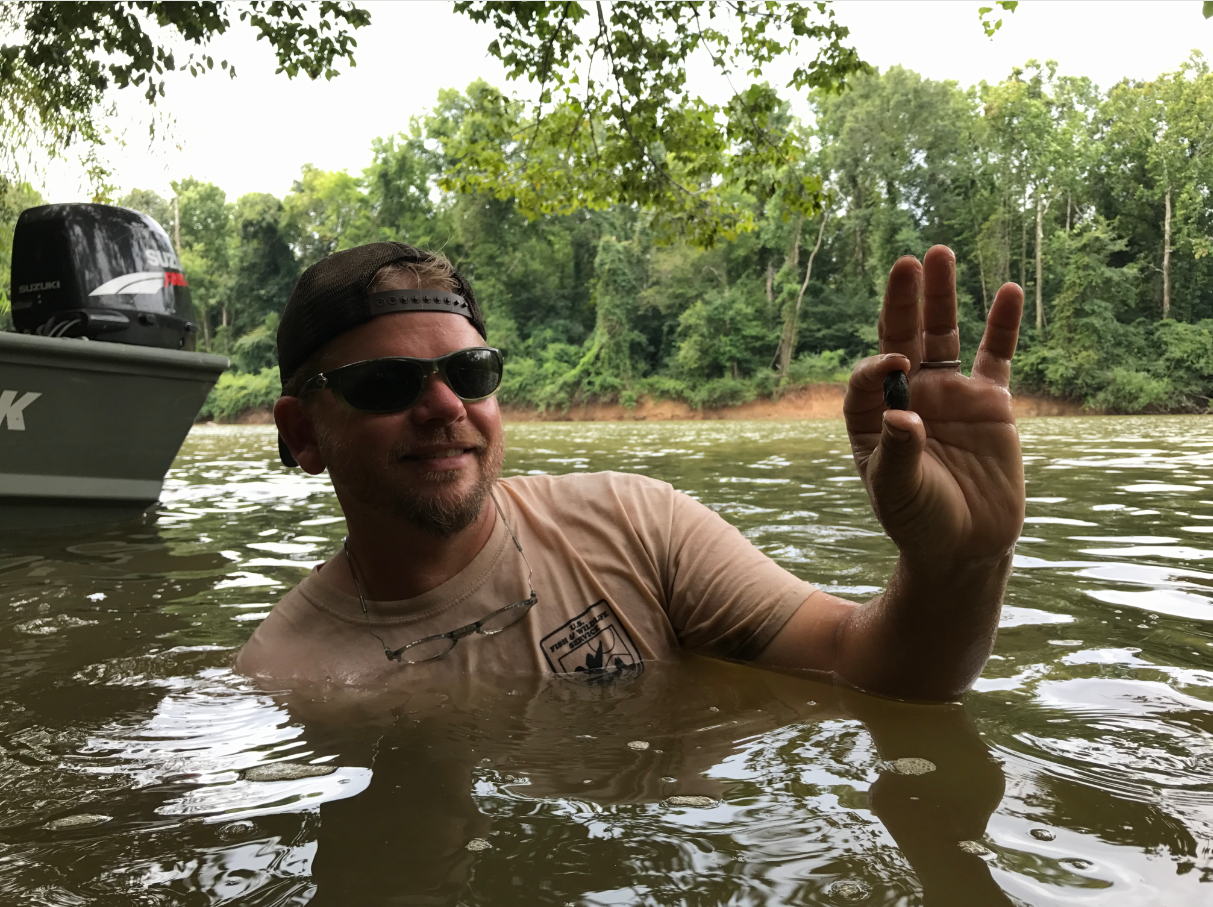
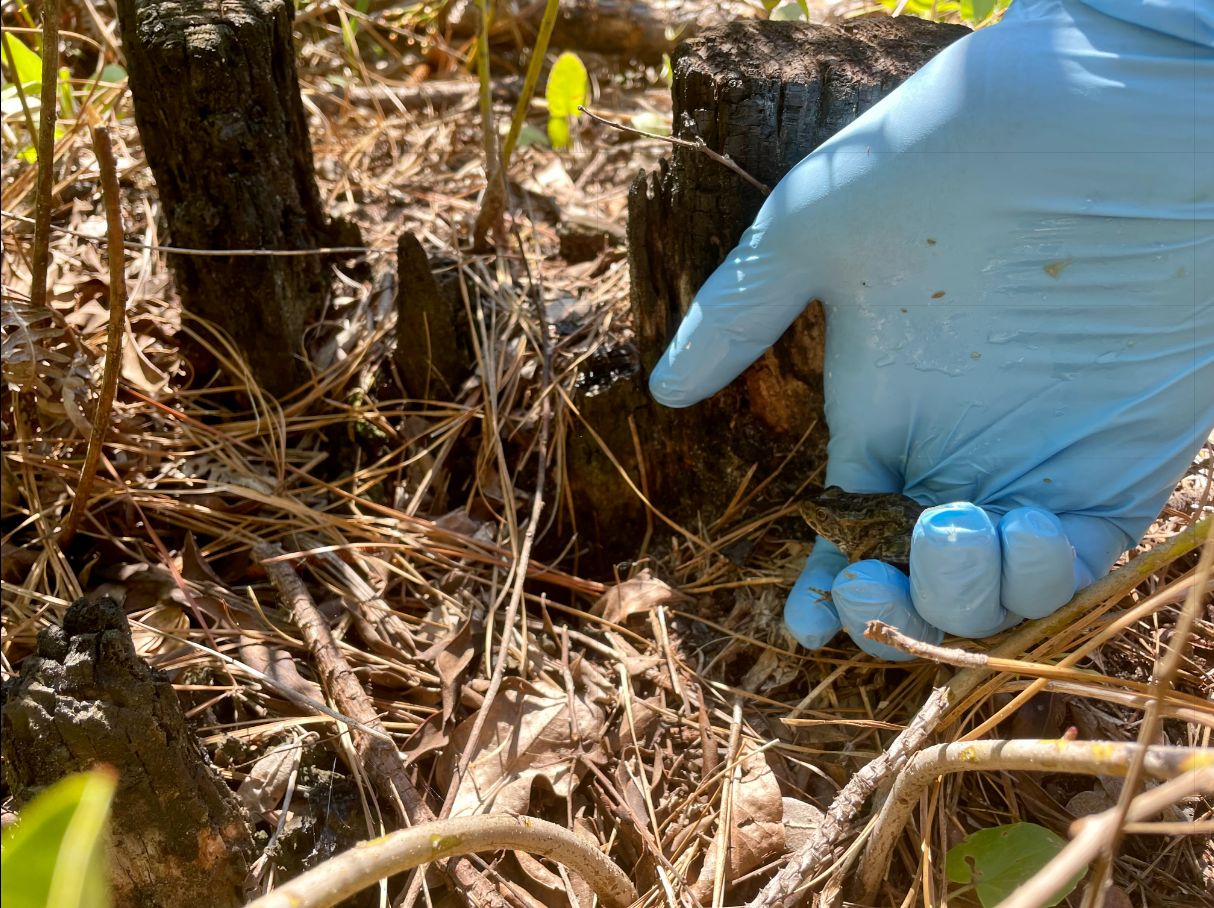
LEFT: A hatchery biologist holds up a freshwater mussel he found in a local river in 2022.
RIGHT: A Carolina gopher frog (Lithobates capito capito) the hatchery raised is released into the wild in 2022.
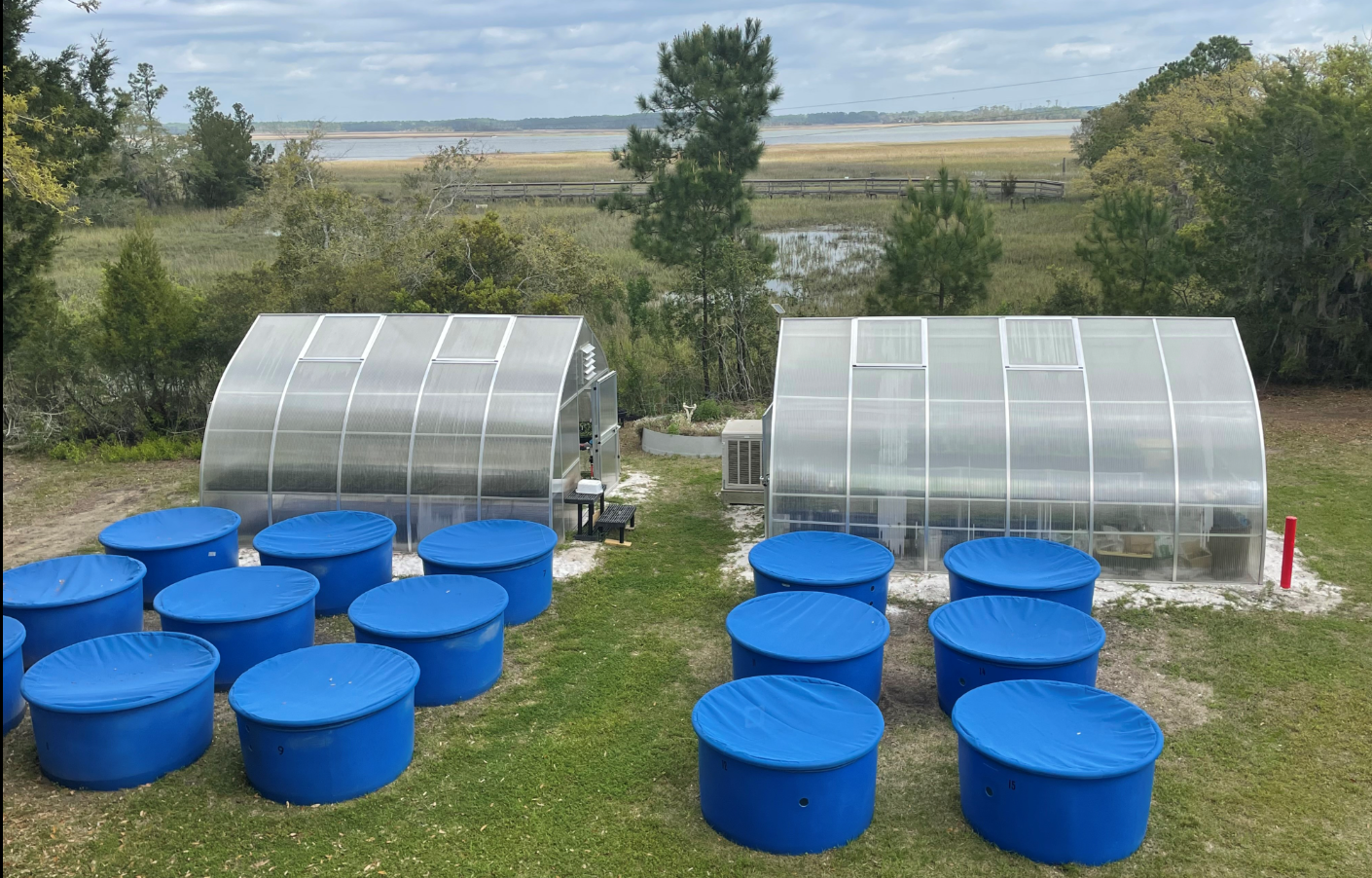
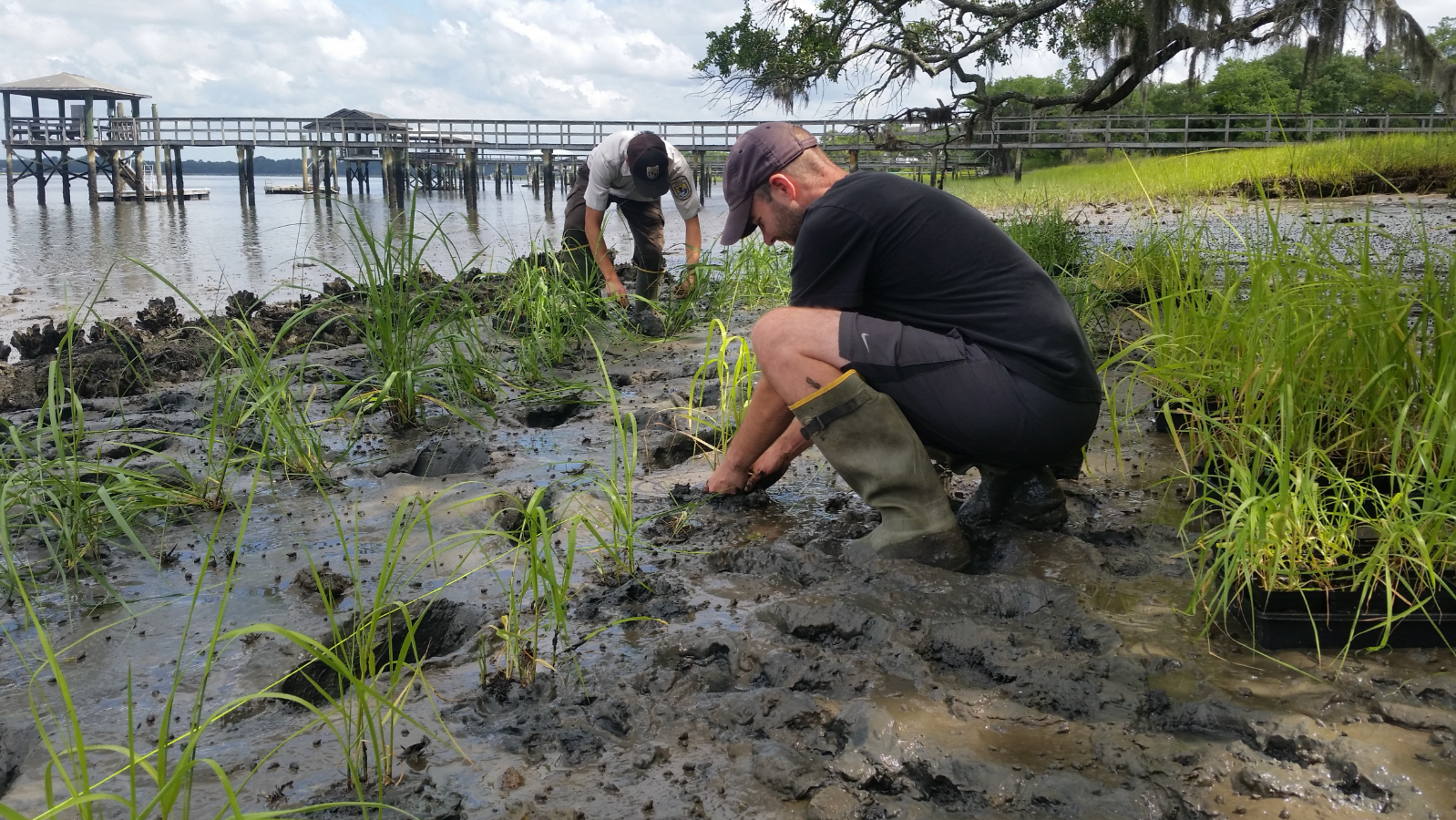
LEFT: The hatchery's greenhouse facility in 2022.
RIGHT: A hatchery biologist and a volunteer plant salt marsh grass along a shoreline adjacent to an artificial oyster reef in 2022.

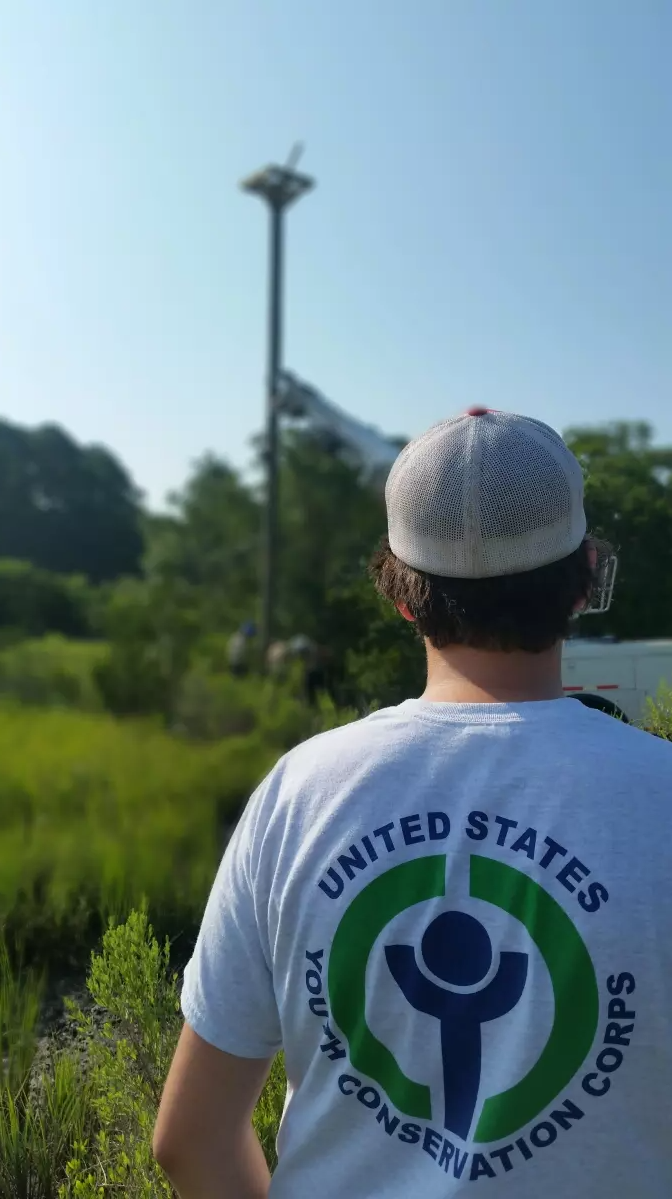
A Youth Conservation Corps intern watches as a bird-of-prey platform he built is raised on the hatchery grounds in 2021.

The hatchery collects wild adult American shad from the South Edisto River each year between February and May, strip-spawns them on the river, and immediately returns them to the river. Hatchery personnel then bring the fertilized eggs back to the hatchery for incubation in a controlled environment. The fry hatch about five days later, and the hatchery staff then returns them to the river immediately. Each fall, biologists from the hatchery return to the river, use electrofishing techniques to capture juvenile shad migrating toward the ocean, and conduct a genetic stock assessment.

In a cooperative agreement with the South Carolina Department of Natural Resources, the hatchery produces red drum for mark-and-recapture studies aimed at stock assessment of the species. The Atlantic States Marine Fisheries Commission considers the red drum overfished in South Carolina.

In recent years, the hatchery began conservation work related to threatened and endangered species of freshwater mussel. As of 2025, it is working to develop protocols for the culture and propagation of the Carolina heelsplitter (Lasmigona decorata), Savannah lilliput Toxolasma pullus, and yellow lampmussel (Lampsilis cariosa).

The hatchery partners with the South Carolina Department of Natural Resources, Francis Marion National Forest, the Charleston USFWS Ecological Services Field Office, and the Amphibian and Reptiles Conservancy to rebuild Carolina gopher frog populations. Hatchery employees collect Carolina gopher frog eggs from the wild, bring them back to the hatchery, hatch them, raise the tadpoles in protected environments until they metamorphose into frogs, then release the young froglets at the places where the eggs were collected.

The hatchery works with the South Carolina Department of Natural Resources, private landowners, and other partners around Charleston, South Carolina, to improve salt marsh habitats by building artificial oyster reefs and planting smooth cordgrass (Sporobolus alterniflorus) to protect shorelines from wave action and erosion and to provide habitats and nursery environments for fish and marine invertebrates. The artificial oyster reefs also provide habitats that support eastern oysters (Crassostrea virginica), whose filter feeding helps to maintain water quality.

The hatchery promotes the recovery of native plant species through research, collaboration with partners (including the Charleston USFWS Ecological Services Field Office), propagation, rearing, and planting activities. Species the hatchery staff works with include American chaffseed (Schwalbea americana), species of the genus Pityopsis, Macbridea caroliniana, milkweed (genus Asclepias), coastal salt marsh grass, and the Venus flytrap (Dionaea muscipula). Hatchery staff members collect native plants and seeds from the wild, propagate them in the hatchery's greenhouses, and return them to the wild. The hatchery also maintains pollinator gardens at its greenhouse facility.

The hatchery accepts volunteers and interns to help with projects and daily operations, providing on-the-job training and requiring no prior experience. Volunteers and interns take part in surveying fish populations, constructing artificial oyster reefs, restoring salt marsh habitats, fish husbandry, reestablishing native plants, photography of cultural and natural resources, leading tours, providing information to school groups and visitors, and facility maintenance activities such as mowing, pruning, weeding, painting, plumbing, and woodworking. They also take part in special projects. The hatchery's interns are from such organizations as the Youth Conservation Corps and the Student Conservation Association.

== History ==
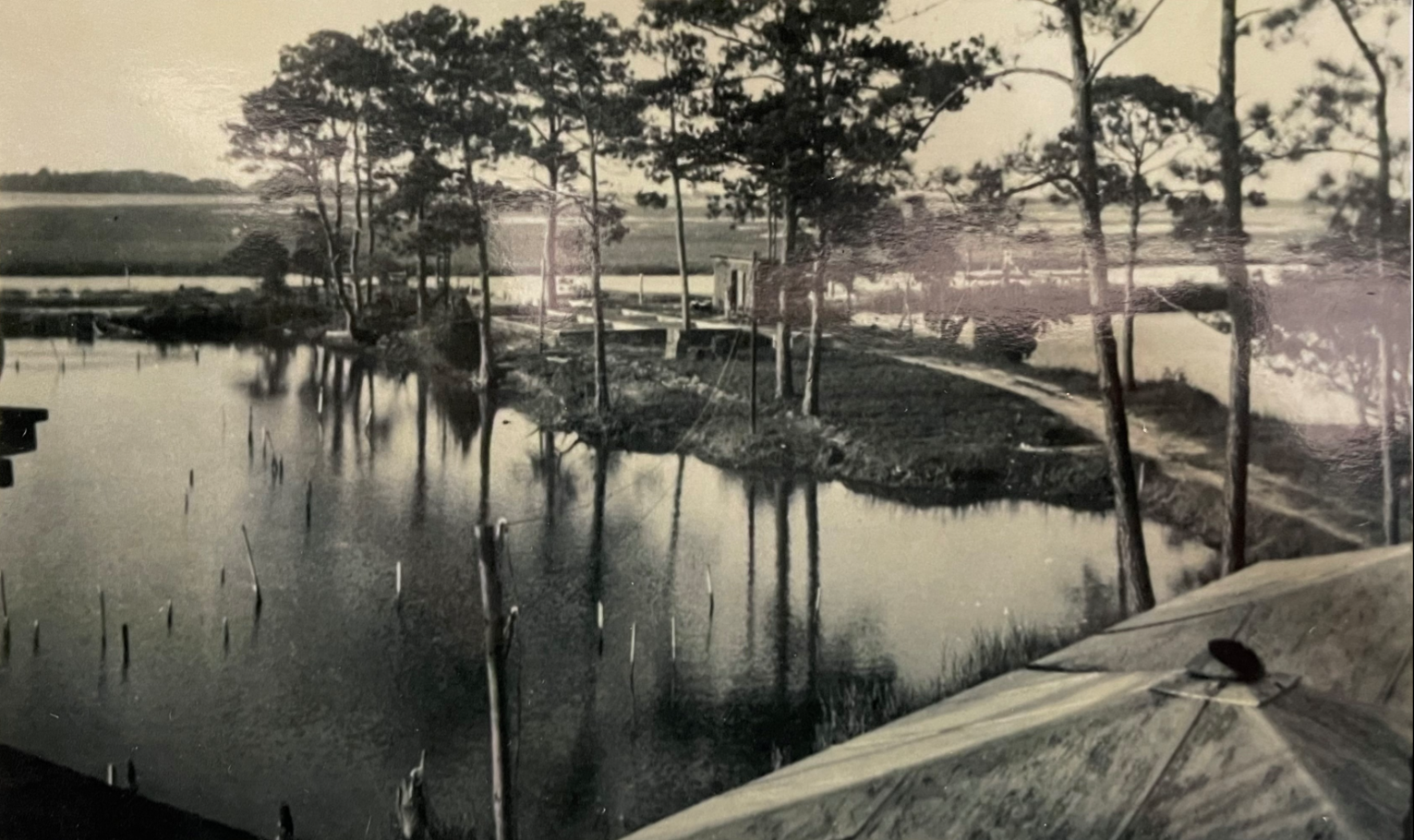
The original fish ponds, located along Wee Creek, at the Bears Bluff Laboratories sometime between 1946 and the 1960s.

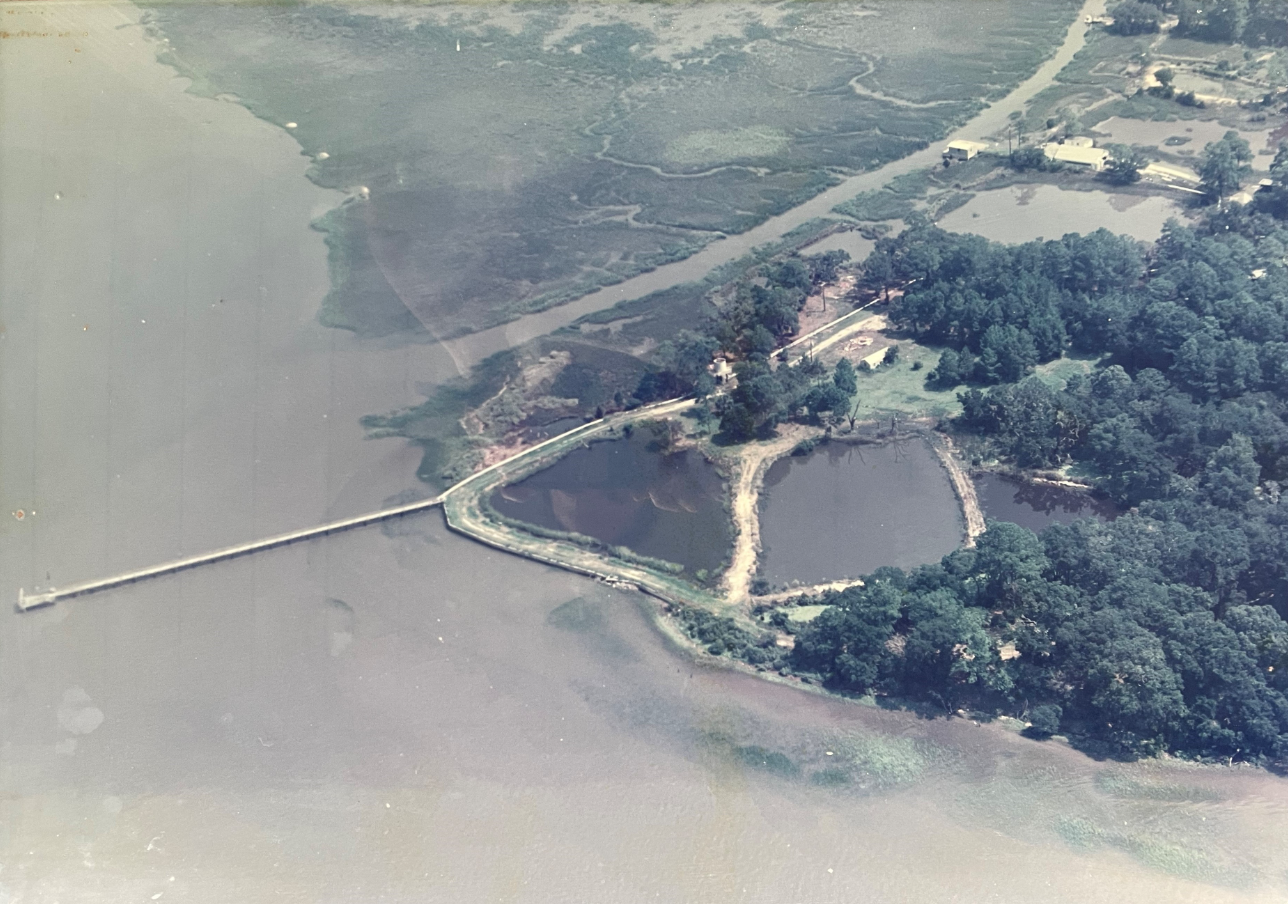
An aerial view of the hatchery in 1989.

In 1946, H. Jermain Slocum donated land on Wadmalaw Island which allowed the establishment there of the Bears Bluff Laboratories, a nonprofit marine research station directed by Robert Lunz, funded by the Slocum and Lunz Foundation, and focused on marine ecology and monitoring the status of commercial fisheries in South Carolina. Between 1946 and 1952, the Bears Bluff Laboratories constructed laboratories, a dormitory, work shops, salt-water ponds, fresh-water ponds, and a dock that supported a 40-foot (12.2 m) research vessel. In 1954, the Bears Bluff Laboratories partnered with the College of Charleston and the Medical University of South Carolina and expanded the marine research station.

In 1970, the Government of South Carolina's Department of Natural Resources established its Marine Division on the property, and the Bears Bluff Laboratories' research activities moved to the Fort Johnson Laboratory. Later in the 1970s the U.S. Government's Environmental Protection Agency took control of the site, where it conducted toxicological research into the effects of various chemicals on marine organisms.

In 1981, the USFWS took over the facilities, which at the time included a 35-acre (14-hectare) parcel of land, and established the Bears Bluff National Fish Hatchery on the site. Initially, the hatchery focused on restoration and mitigation of declining fish populations such as those of the striped bass (Morone saxatilis), Atlantic sturgeon, shortnose sturgeon (Acipenser brevirostrum), and red drum, partnering with other agencies of the U.S. Government and with the Government of South Carolina to further these goals.

Between 2000 and 2024, the hatchery provided over 5 million fish to support recreational and commercial fishing, improved more than 2 miles (3.2 km) of aquatic habitat, and removed over 1,000 pounds (454 kg) of non-native fish species in the Southeastern United States. In 2000, the hatchery entered into a cooperative agreement with the South Carolina Department of Natural Resources to produce red drum. The hatchery made its first attempt to spawn American shad in 2008, using fish from the Santee River–Cooper River system. In 2008, the hatchery also began working with the South Carolina Department of Natural Resources, private landowners, and other partners around Charleston, South Carolina, to improve salt marsh habitats. The hatchery's work related to raising Atlantic sturgeon on site also began in 2008 when it acquired its first adult sturgeon. Research partners helped it to acquire six adult sturgeons by 2010. They spawned at the hatchery for the first time in the fall of 2011 and as of 2025 have spawned annually since then.

== Recreation ==
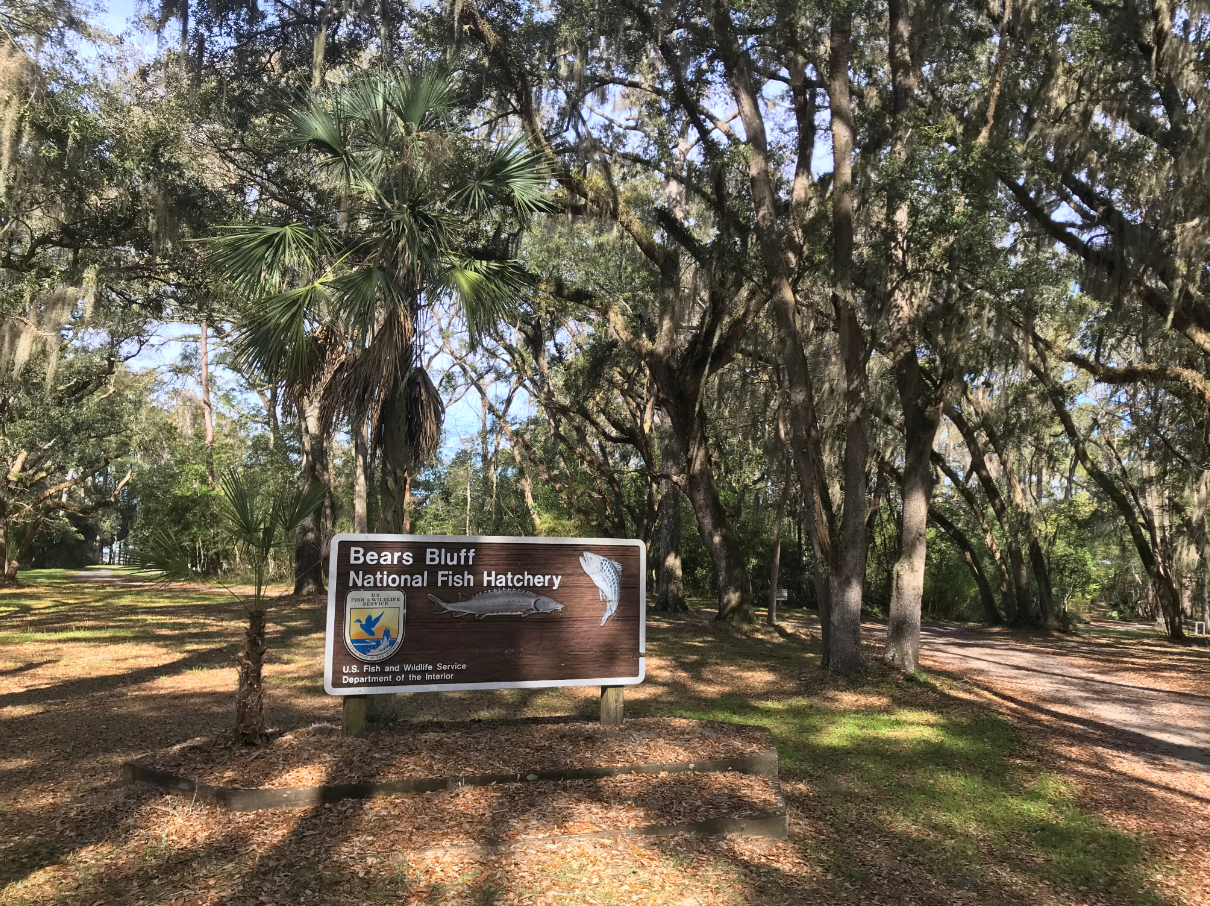
The hatchery's entrance

The Bears Bluff National Fish Hatchery is open to visitors Monday through Friday from 7:30 a.m. to 4:00 p.m. Eastern Time except on U.S. Government holidays. The hatchery is open to self-guided tours, and offers guided tours to interested groups.

The seasonal nature of the hatchery's work results in visitors seeing different species and different hatchery activities depending on the time of year. American shad eggs, fry, and adults can be viewed each year between February and May and Savannah lilliputs are on station from May to August, while the life cycle of Carolina gopher frogs from eggs to tadpoles and finally to adults can be seen between February and July. Red drum are on site as fry from September to November; although visitors may view the production ponds holding red drum, the fish themselves are not placed on public display. Atlantic sturgeon are on display year-round, and in years in which they spawn their eggs and newly hatched fry are available for viewing in August and September. The shell collection station for eastern oysters is open all year; artificial oyster reef construction usually takes place between May and September. American chaffseed cultivation can be seen all year.

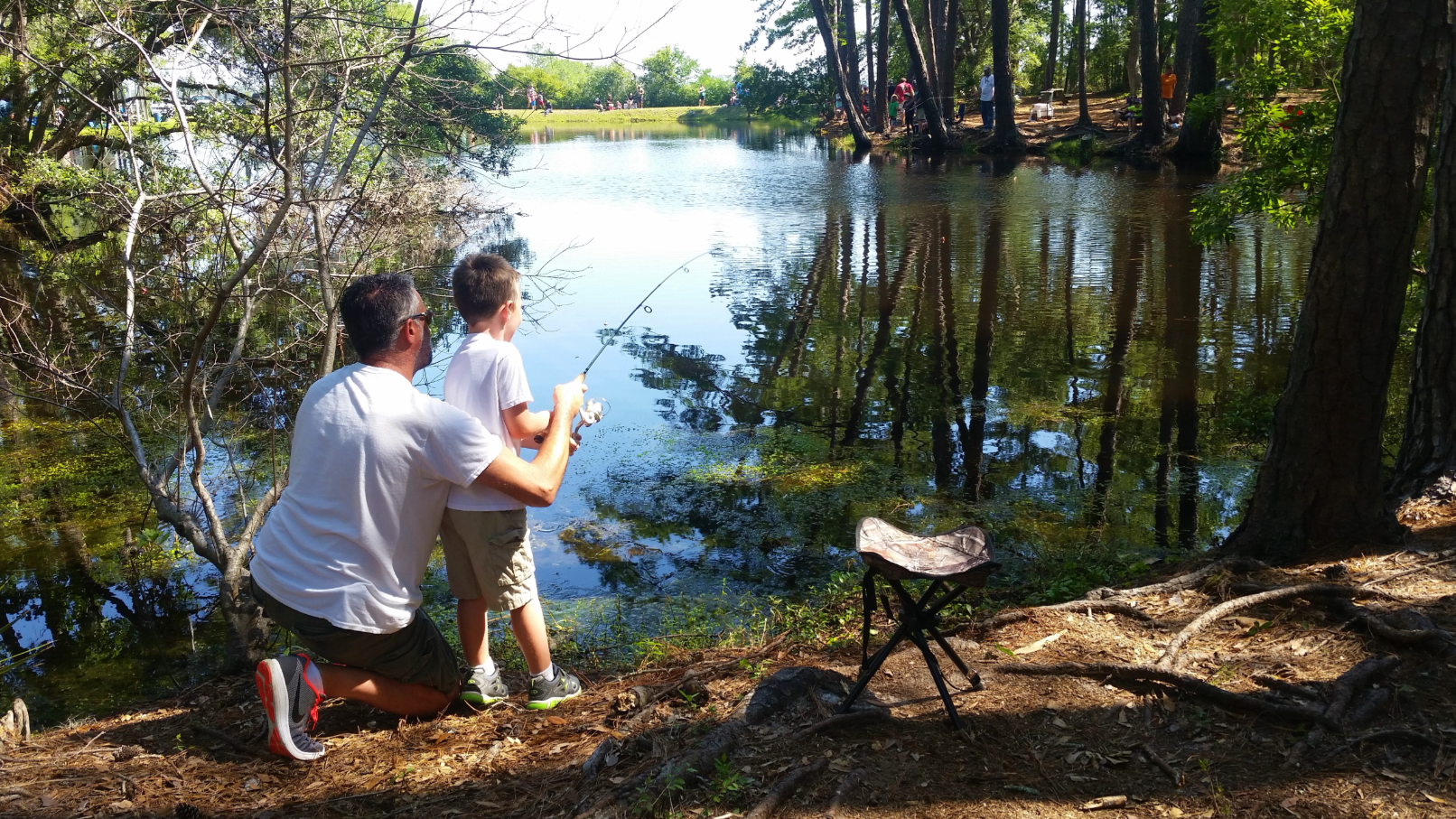
A Kids Fishing Day event at the hatchery in 2021.

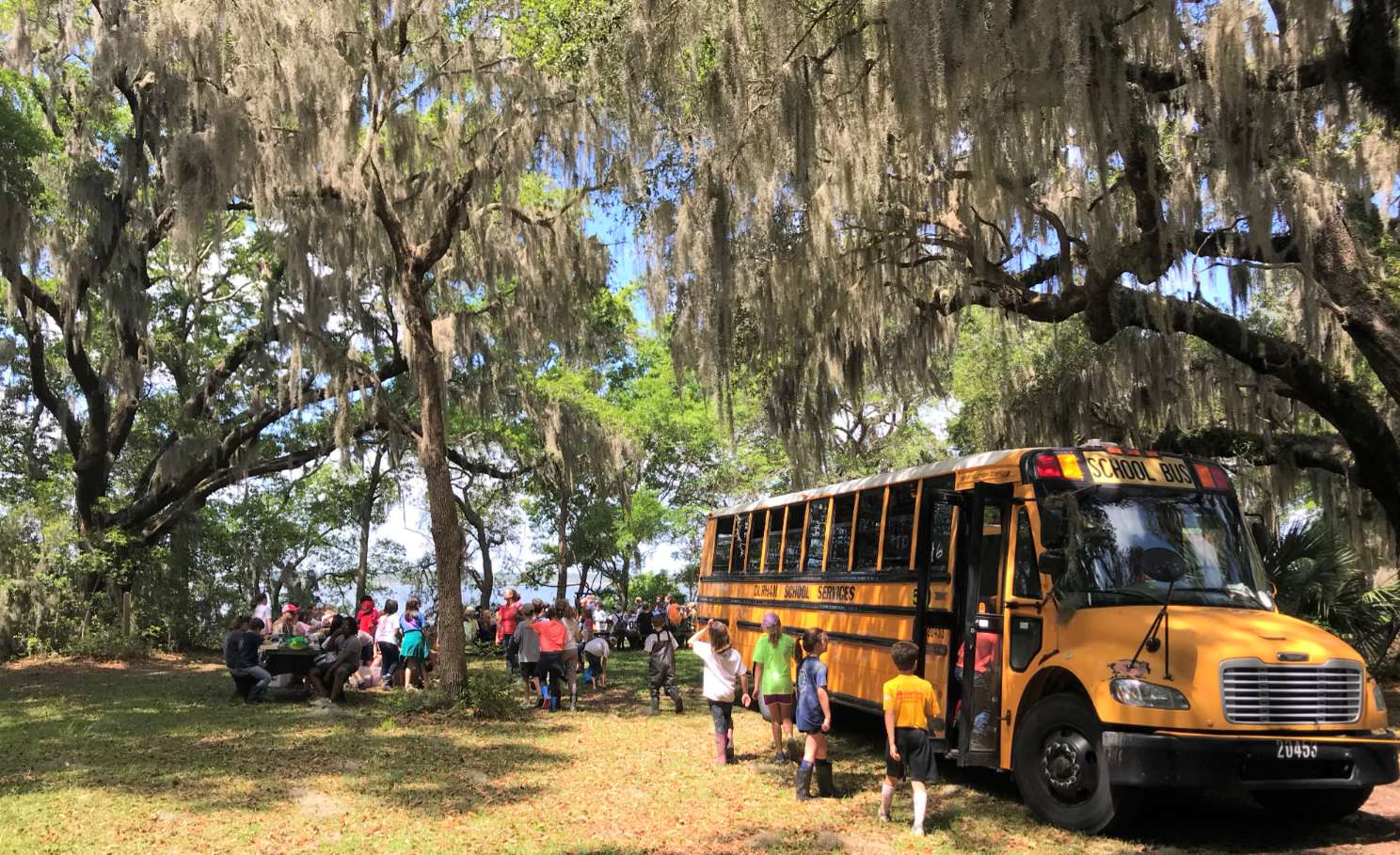
Schoolchildren arrive for a hatchery tour in 2021.

The hatchery grounds afford visitors opportunities for picnicking, dog walking, learning about the South Carolina Lowcountry environment from informational signs and kiosks, birdwatching, wildlife observation, and wildlife photography. Visitors sometimes can observe American alligators (Alligator mississippiensis) and painted buntings (Passerina ciris) while at the hatchery.

The hatchery grounds include the Bears Bluff Loop Trail, a self-guided 0.7-mile (1.1 km) walking trail with a mix of grassy and gravel surfaces that highlights the South Carolina Lowcountry ecosystem. The trail is open all year. It begins near large kiosks at the hatchery entrance and takes visitors on a boardwalk over the hatchery's fresh-water pond, past a cinderblock laboratory, past the greenhouses, and on a boardwalk over a salt marsh. Along the way, visitors on the trail pass by the hatchery's production ponds, pollinator gardens at the greenhouses, oyster shell collection sites, and the hatchery's administrative offices.

== See also ==
- National Fish Hatchery System
- List of National Fish Hatcheries in the United States
