= Lumber River State Park =

State park in North Carolina, United States

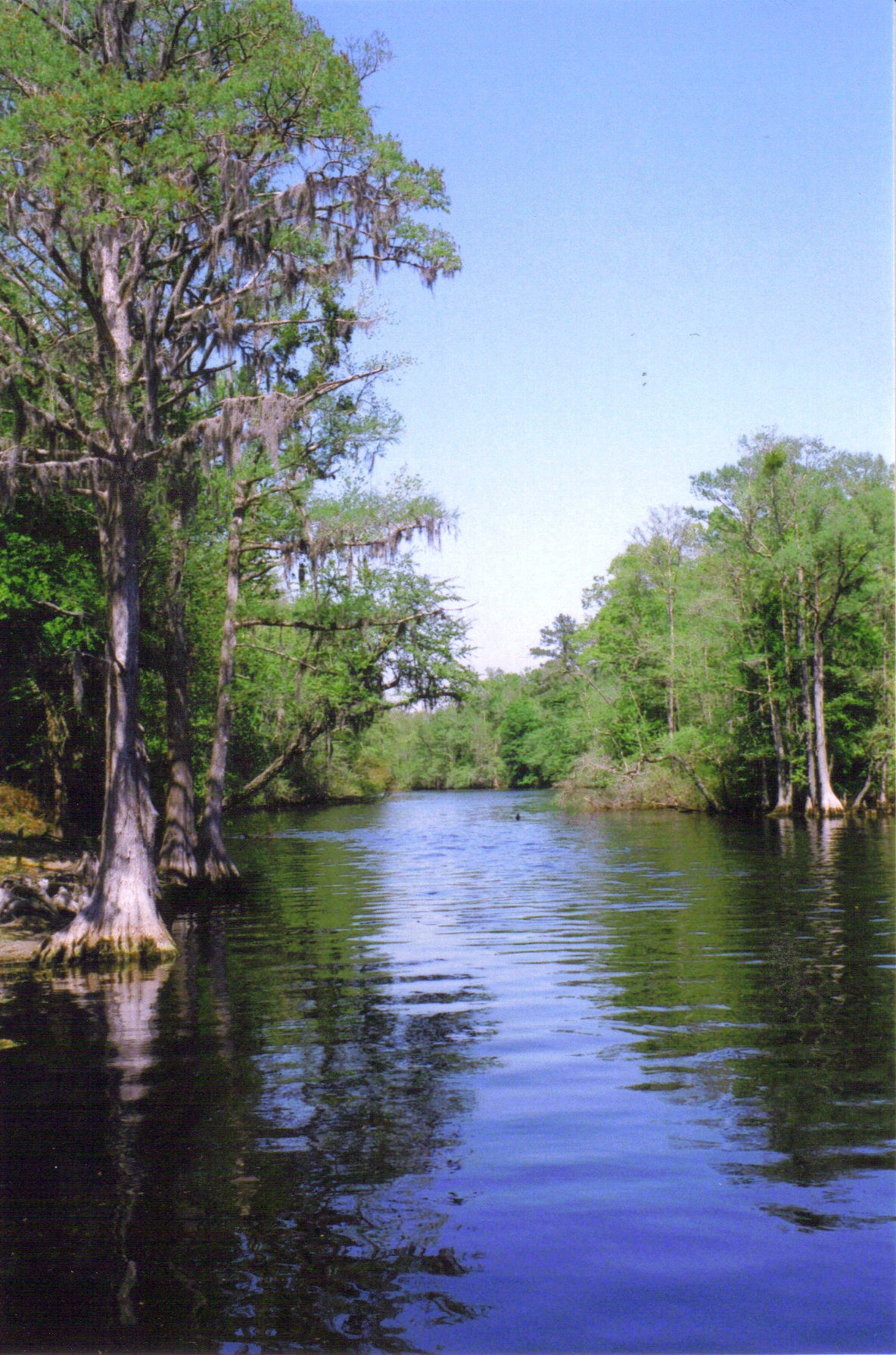

- Location within North Carolina Location within the United States
- Interactive map of Lumber River State Park
- Location: Scotland, Hoke, Robeson and Columbus counties, North Carolina, United States
- Coordinates: 34°23′24″N 79°00′08″W
- Area: 13,659 acres (5,528 ha)
- Elevation: 102 ft (31 m)
- Established: 1989
- Administrator: North Carolina Division of Parks and Recreation
- Website: Official website

Lumber River State Park is a North Carolina state park along the Lumber River in Scotland, Hoke, Robeson and Columbus counties. It covers 13,659 acres (55.28 km^{2}) along a 115-mile (185-km) stretch of the Lumber River. Lumber River State Park is located in North Carolina's Coastal Plain. It was established in 1989 as both a state park and designated as a "Natural and Scenic River" by the North Carolina General Assembly. In addition, it is the only blackwater river in North Carolina to be designated as a National Wild and Scenic River by the Department of the Interior.

Lumber River State Park encompasses parts of four counties along the Lumber River. The headwaters of the river are in Scotland County. The Lumber River bisects Robeson County. The recreational facilities are at the Princess Ann Landing in southeastern Robeson County near the towns of Orrum and Fair Bluff. The river ends in South Carolina, where it joins the Little Pee Dee River about 8 miles (13 km) south of the state line.

== History ==
The Lumber River is the only blackwater river in North Carolina to be designated as a National Wild and Scenic River by the United States (US) Department of the Interior. The river is 115 miles (185 km) long from its headwaters at the confluence of Drowning Creek and Buffalo Creek near Wagram in Scotland County. The river flows freely along its entire course, making it one of the longest unobstructed rivers in North Carolina.

The upper section of the river was designated as a State Recreational Water Trail in 1978. The river was established as a National Canoe Trail in 1981. The lower Lumber River was designated as a State Canoe Trail in 1984. The General Assembly established the Lumber River as a Natural and Scenic River and also as a state park in 1989.

The first European settlements were made by Scots-Irish who migrated to the area in the late 18th century. They chartered Princess Ann in 1796. The town was the second to be established in Robeson County, and the first settled by people ascending the river from South Carolina. Princess Ann has since been abandoned. The name survives in local folklore and as the name of the road that leads to the park.

The recreational facilities for Lumber River State Park are in a section of Robeson County known as Princess Ann.

== Recreation ==
The Lumber River has 24 boat launches that serve as access points to Lumber River State Park. The entire length of the river is open to fishing. The common game fish are black crappie, largemouth bass, catfish and redbreast sunfish. All anglers must have a valid fishing license and follow the regulations of the North Carolina Wildlife Resources Commission.

Nine primitive camping sites are located at the Princess Ann section of the park. These campsites are meant to be used by no more than six people at a time. Each camp site features a picnic table and grill, lantern holder, trash can, and fire ring. Princess Ann has several hiking trails and picnic areas, and many municipal and county parks are located on the Lumber River as well.

== Plants and wildlife ==
Lumber River State Park provides a habitat for a wide variety of plants and animals. Wildflowers that can be seen at the park include wisteria, sarvis holly, Carolina bogmint, mountain laurel, wild azalea, spider lily and swamp mallow. Trees found in the swamps along the river include bald cypress, water elm, river birch and tulip poplar. Animals and birds in the area include the American alligator, white-tailed deer, American black bear, beavers, and northern river otters; and barred owls, great blue heron, wild turkey, sandpipers and prothonotary warblers.
