= Pattalias =

Scientific classification
- Kingdom: Plantae
- Clade: Tracheophytes
- Clade: Angiosperms
- Clade: Eudicots
- Clade: Asterids
- Order: Gentianales
- Family: Apocynaceae
- Genus: Pattalias; S.Watson (1889)

species
- Pattalias palmeri S.Watson; Pattalias palustris (Pursh) Fishbein

Synonyms
- Lyonia Elliott (1817), nom. illeg., not Lyonia Raf. (1808), nom. rej. or Lyonia Nutt. (1818), nom. cons.; Macbridea Raf. (1818), nom. rej., not Macbridea Elliot (1818), nom. cons.; Seutera Rchb. (1828), nom. superfl.

Genus of plants

Pattalias is a genus of flowering plants in the family Apocynaceae. It is native to Mexico, Belize, the West Indies, and the southeastern United States.

== Taxonomy ==
The two species placed in the genus were for many years sunk into a broadly defined genus Cynanchum. In 2005, on the basis of both molecular phylogenetic and morphological evidence, it was proposed that they should be placed in a separate genus. Determining the correct name to be used for this genus involves a complex taxonomic history. The genus was first described in 1817 by Elliott using the name Lyonia. However, this name had already been published in 1808 by Constantine Samuel Rafinesque for a genus in the family Polygonaceae, so Elliott's name is an illegitimate later homonym. In 1818, Rafinesque published a replacement name, Macbridea. This too has been treated as an illegitimate later homonym, as Thomas Nuttall had published Macbridea in the same year for a genus in the family Lamiaceae, ascribing the name to Elliott. In 1828, Ludwig Reichenbach published Seutera as a replacement name for Elliott's Lyonia, unaware of Rafinesque's Macbridea. In 1889, Sereno Watson published the name Pattalias. It is now considered that Rafinesque may have published Macbridea a few weeks before Nuttall, so Seutera is superfluous. (It could also be confused with Sutera.) A proposal to conserve Seutera was rejected. As Macbridea Elliott has been conserved against Macbridea Raf., the remaining legitimate name is Watson's Pattalias.

=== Species ===
Two species are accepted:

- Pattalias palmeri S. Watson - Baja California Sur
- Pattalias palustris (Pursh) Fishbein - Cuba, southeastern United States, Veracruz, Yucatán Peninsula
