= Bear Bluff =

Bear Bluff or Bears Bluff may refer to:

- Bear Bluff, Wisconsin, a town in Jackson County, Wisconsin, United States
- Bear Bluff Formation, a geologic formation in North Carolina, United States
- Bears Bluff National Fish Hatchery, a fish hatchery and park in Charleston County, South Carolina, United States
