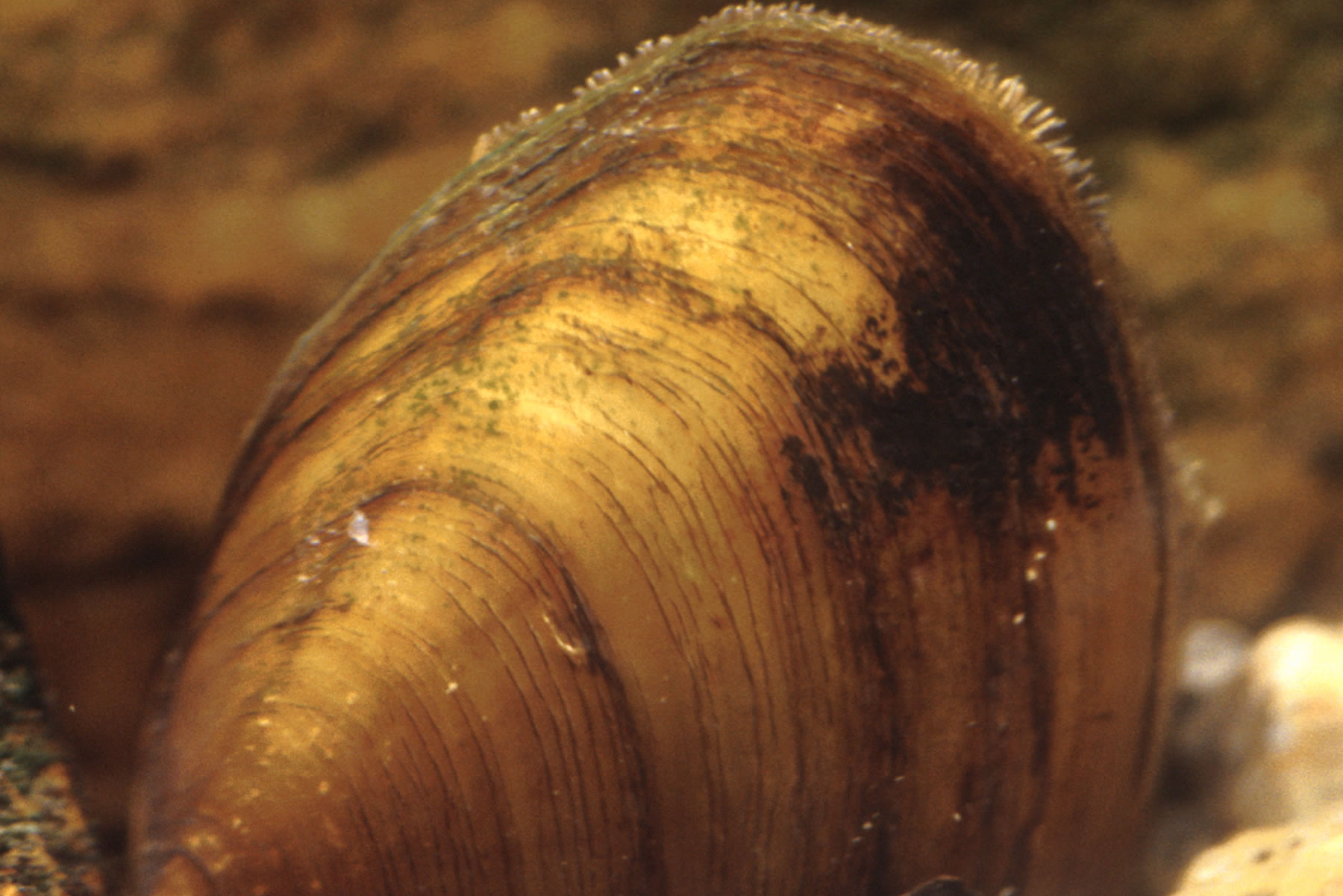

Conservation status
- Critically Endangered (IUCN 3.1)
- CITES Appendix I

Scientific classification
- Kingdom: Animalia
- Phylum: Mollusca
- Class: Bivalvia
- Order: Unionida
- Family: Unionidae
- Genus: Toxolasma
- Species: T. cylindrellus

Binomial name
- Toxolasma cylindrellus (Lea, 1868)

Synonyms
- Carunculina cylindrellus (Lea, 1868)

= Toxolasma cylindrellus =

Species of bivalve

Toxolasma cylindrellus, the pale lilliput naiad, pale lilliput pearly mussel, or pale lilliput, is a species of freshwater mussel, an aquatic bivalve mollusk in the family Unionidae, the river mussels. Its host is the northern studfish.

== Distribution ==
This species is endemic to the United States. It has experienced a great range reduction and is currently found only in the Paint Rock River drainage in northern Alabama and southeastern Tennessee. The most recent surveys failed to find this species in the Tennessee portion of the drainage.

== Conservation ==
The pale lilliput has been listed as endangered under the Endangered Species Act of 1973 since 1976.

The Alabama Aquatic Biodiversity Center (AABC), a state-run facility near Marion, Alabama, has bred the pale lilliput in captivity and released young mussels into the Paint Rock River to bolster wild populations. As of 2026, reintroduced populations had grown numerous enough that AABC director Paul Johnson said the species may soon be eligible for delisting from the endangered species list.
