= Pattalias palustris =

Scientific classification
- Kingdom: Plantae
- Clade: Tracheophytes
- Clade: Angiosperms
- Clade: Eudicots
- Clade: Asterids
- Order: Gentianales
- Family: Apocynaceae
- Genus: Pattalias
- Species: P. palustris

Binomial name
- Pattalias palustris (Pursh) Fishbein (2017)

Synonyms
- Amphistelma salinarum C.Wright ex Griseb. (1866); Ceropegia palustris Pursh (1813); Cynanchum angustifolium Pers. (1805); Cynanchum palustre (Pursh) A.Heller (1898); Cynanchum salinarum (C.Wright ex Griseb.) Alain (1955); Cynoctonum angustifolium (Pers.) Small (1896); Funastrum angustifolium (Pers.) Liede & Meve (2002 publ. 2003); Lyonia maritima Elliott (1817), nom. superfl.; Lyonia palustris (Pursh) Small (1913); Macbridea maritima Raf. (1818), nom. superfl.; Metastelma palustre (Pursh) Schltr. (1899); Metastelma salinarum (C.Wright ex Griseb.) C.Wright (1870); Seutera angustifolia (Pers.) Fishbein & W.D.Stevens (2005); Seutera maritima Decne. (1844), nom. superfl.; Seutera palustris (Pursh) Vail (1903); Vincetoxicum palustre (Pursh) A.Gray (1878); Vincetoxicum salinarum (C.Wright ex Griseb.) Benth. & Hook.f. ex B.D.Jacks. (1895)

Species of flowering plant

Pattalias palustris is a plant species in the family Apocynaceae, also known as Gulf Coast swallow wort. It is native to the southeastern United States from North Carolina to Texas, and to Mexico, Belize, Cuba, the Bahamas, Turks and Caicos Islands, and Cayman Islands.

A perennial vine, it is found in areas of dunes, salt marsh, and coastal hammock within Florida and Alabama.

It was originally known as Cynanchum angustifolium and subsequently known as Seutera angustifolia before it was reclassified as Pattalias palustris by Fishbein in 2017.
