= Lumber River =

River in North Carolina, United States

Lumber River Tributary to Little Pee Dee River
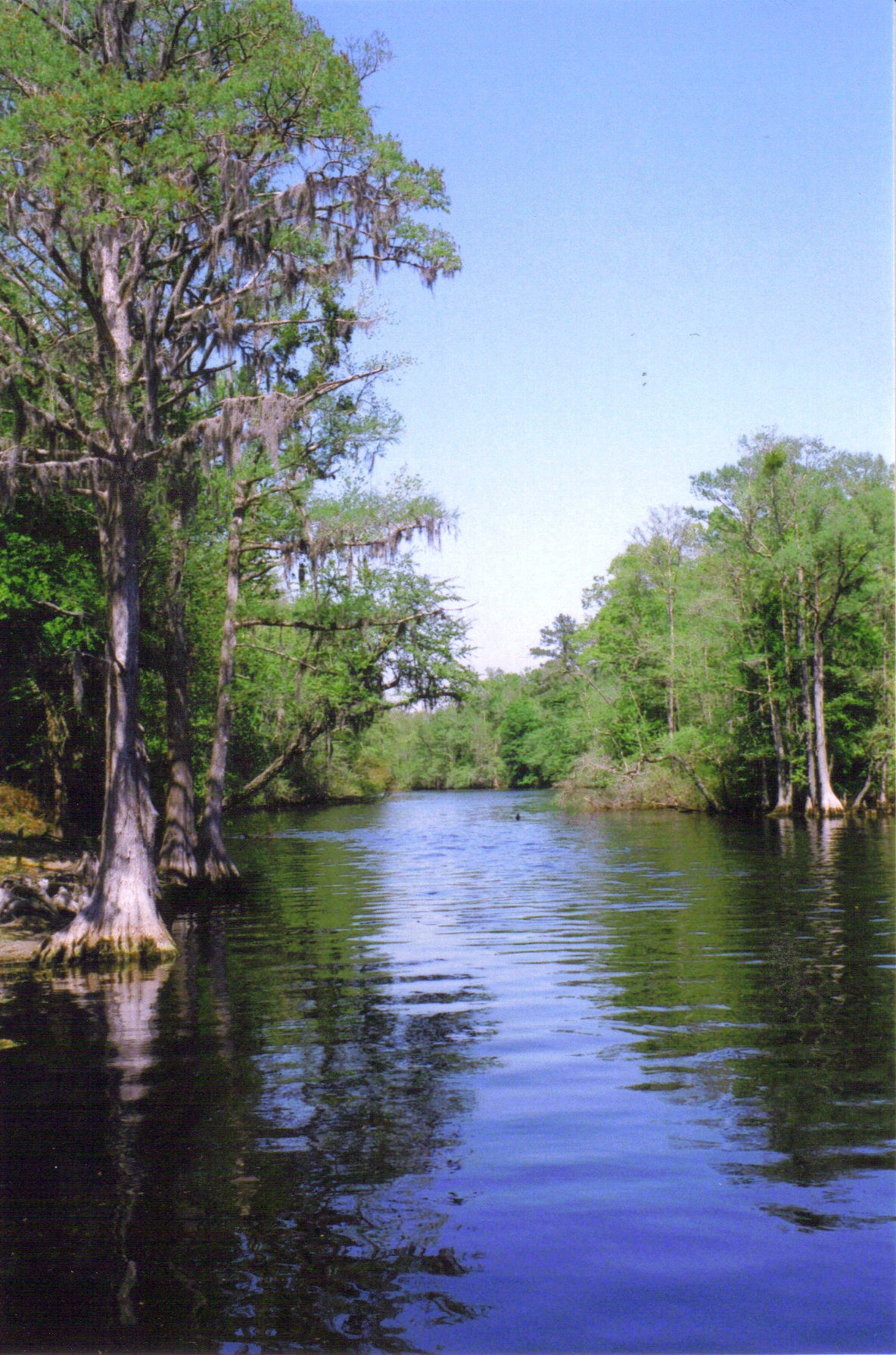
- The Lumber River as seen from the boat launch at Princess Ann near Orrum

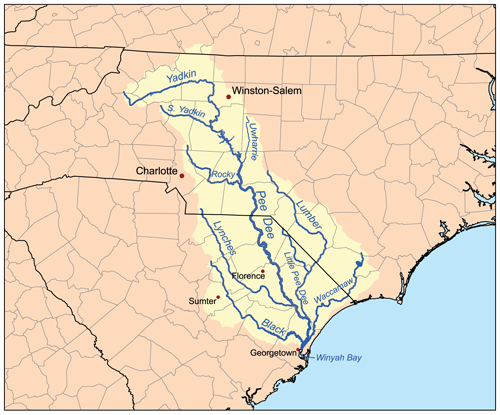
- Map of the Pee Dee River watershed showing the Lumber River.

Location
- Country: United States
- State: North Carolina; South Carolina
- County (South Carolina): Dillon; Horry; Marion
- County (North Carolina): Columbus; Hoke; Robeson; Scotland
- City: Lumberton

Physical characteristics
- Source: Drowning Creek, Moore County, NC
  - location: 1.25 mi (2 km) west of Samarcand, Moore County, North Carolina
  - coordinates: 34°57′43″N 079°21′58″W
  - elevation: 225 ft (69 m)
- Mouth: Little Pee Dee River
  - location: about 1 mile southwest of Nichols, South Carolina
  - coordinates: 34°11′44″N 079°09′56″W
  - elevation: 39 ft (12 m)
- Length: 123.71 mi (199.09 km)
- Basin size: 1,749.86 square miles (4,532.1 km^{2})
- Discharge
  - location: Little Pee Dee River
  - average: 1,851.55 cu ft/s (52.430 m^{3}/s) at mouth with Little Pee Dee River

Basin features
- Progression: southeast then southwest
- River system: Pee Dee River
- Tributaries
  - left: Gum Swamp; Mill Branch; Bear Swamp; Jacks Branch; Raft Swamp; Powell Branch; Saddletree Swamp; Jacob Swamp; Piney Island Canal; Big Swamp Canal; River Swamp; Porter Swamp; Gapway Swamp
  - right: Buck Swamp; Cotton Mill Branch; Jacob Swamp; Mill Swamp; Flowers Swamp; Ashpole Swamp
- Bridges: US 401, McGirt Gin Road, Red Springs Road (NC 71), Old Red Springs Road, Alma Road, Recreation Center Road, NC 711, Three Bridges Road, N Chicken Road, Lowe Road, Caton Road, US 301, W 5th Street, NC 41 + 72, S Chestnut Street, Hestertown Road, NC 72, Matthew's Bluff Road, Willoughby Road, NC 904, S Nichols Street (US 76-SC 9)

National Wild and Scenic River
- Type: Scenic, Recreational
- Designated: September 25, 1998

The Lumber River, sometimes referred to as the Lumbee River, is a 133-mile-long (214 km) river in south-central North Carolina in the flat Coastal Plain. Due to its number of whirlpools European settlers called the river Drowning Creek, which is still used as the name of its headwater. The waterway known as the Lumber River extends downstream from the Scotland County-Hoke County border to the North Carolina-South Carolina border. Soon after crossing into South Carolina, the Lumber River flows into the Little Pee Dee River, which flows into the Pee Dee River, or Great Pee Dee River. Finally, the combined waters flow into Winyah Bay and the Atlantic Ocean.

In 1989, the river was designated as a "Natural and Scenic River" by the North Carolina General Assembly. In addition, it is the only blackwater river in North Carolina to be designated as a National Wild and Scenic River by the Department of the Interior. In 2010, the Lumber River was voted one of North Carolina's Ten Natural Wonders, the result of an on-line contest held by Land for Tomorrow, a coalition dedicated to supporting the preservation of North Carolina's land and water resources.

== History ==
=== Ancient indigenous peoples ===
Evidence from archeological excavations along the Lumber River has shown that successive cultures of indigenous Native Americans inhabited this area for thousands of years. A number of archaeological sites have been excavated on high ground along the river. While many have been disturbed by the agricultural practices of the post-Columbian era, numerous artifacts and some fossils have been recovered. These include a dugout canoe made by indigenous people and estimated to be over 1,025 years old. This ancient canoe is on display at the Native American Resource Center at the University of North Carolina at Pembroke.

Much of the archaeological work in the Lumber River region has been done in Robeson County. A total of 429 archaeological sites have been recorded in this area. The sites contain components from various archaeological periods: Paleo-Indian, Archaic Woodland, Mississippian and Historic (after European encounter).

Iroquoian, Siouan, and Carolina Algonquian-speaking peoples were among the historic tribes who lived in the coastal and inland region prior to European encounter. Archeologists have identified 47 sites of potential importance, 20 of which are eligible for inclusion in the National Register of Historic Places.

=== Eighteenth century ===
Early English surveyors named the river "Drowning Creek." In 1749, British colonial records identified the river as a branch of the Little Pee Dee River. In 1809, the North Carolina state legislature changed the name of the river to Lumber, most likely to symbolize the thriving lumber industry in the area, and its use of the river for transporting logs. They wanted a name more positive than Drowning Creek.

=== Nineteenth century ===
In the late 18th and the 19th centuries, the lumbering and naval stores industries were critical to the region's economy. The Lumber River became a vital route for transporting 100-foot logs downriver to the seaport of Georgetown, South Carolina. Lumberton, North Carolina was important for the timber industry and associated production of turpentine. Although no large 19th-century mills or factories remain intact, the landscape still bears physical traces of that bygone era. Old bridge abutments, remnants of tram bridges, and dock pilings are especially visible in areas like the “Net Hole” and stand as silent reminders of the Lumber River's historic role as the backbone of the region's timber and naval stores economy. The Lumber River did more than just transport logs. It shaped settlement patterns and commercial development. Towns like Lumberton and early inland communities such as Princess Ann were established along the river during this time although they are not present today.

=== Twenty first century ===
Recent hurricanes like Matthew (2016) and Florence (2018) produced widespread flooding in the Lumber River basin and affected Robeson County communities significantly. Research on disaster recovery in the region highlights regional resilience, including aid efforts, tribal coordination, and communities who came together and supported long term building. Many citizens along the Lumber River and surrounding areas experienced long-term displacement and economic disruption as floodwaters remained in low-lying areas for days and, in some cases, weeks. In addition, these disasters have led to increased discussions about climate change, floodplain management, and the need for future planning to reduce vulnerability in the Lumber River watershed.

== Ecology ==
The Lumber River has a very diverse swamp and wetland ecosystem that includes cypress and black gum swamps. These habitats provide critical nursery grounds for fish and wildlife. Environmental changes have affected water quality and ecological resilience in the system.

As a blackwater river, the Lumber has naturally acidic, dark-colored water caused by tannins from decaying leaves and plants in nearby swamps. This water is low in nutrients, so only certain plants and animals that can handle these conditions are able to live there. Many species in the Lumber River have adapted to the low pH and limited nutrients, making the river an important home for unique wetland and aquatic life.

In addition to supporting fish and aquatic species, the wetlands along the Lumber River also provide habitat for mammals, amphibians, migratory birds, and many species of reptiles. Conservation efforts in the region aim to preserve these natural functions by protecting wetlands, restoring damaged areas, and monitoring water quality. Such efforts play a key role in ensuring the long-term health of the river and the wildlife and communities that depend on it.

Studies of the Lumber River watershed indicate that climate change has contributed to increased rainfall variability, more frequent high-flow events, and greater hurricane-related flooding in southeastern North Carolina. Heavy storms such as Hurricanes Matthew and Florence produced prolonged inundation in the watershed and exacerbated water-quality degradation through sediment and nutrient loading.

== Environmental Issues ==
The nonprofit American Rivers listed the Lumber River as among "America's Top 10 Most Endangered Rivers" in 2026, citing pollution from agriculture and the "forever chemicals" PFAS leaching from landfills and discharged by wastewater treatment plants.

== Recreation ==
In the 21st century, the Lumber River has become a major recreation corridor in southeastern North Carolina and is recognized for its scenic, ecological, and cultural value. The river serves as the central feature of The Lumber River State Park, which offers numerous opportunities for outdoor activities, including canoeing, kayaking, boating, fishing, hunting, picnicking, camping, nature study, swimming, hiking, and cycling. The calm blackwater conditions and extensive swamp forest environment make the river especially popular for paddling and wildlife viewing, with visitors frequently encountering deer, otters, turtles, and a wide variety of bird species.

In addition to outdoor recreation, the river supports a variety of community events and seasonal festivals such as powwows that celebrate regional history and culture. Local organizations and municipalities host fishing tournaments, paddling excursions, educational nature walks, and heritage programs that highlight the landscape, Lumbee cultural traditions, and the role of the river in shaping the region's identity. The accessible boat launches, park facilities, and designated recreation areas have helped increase tourism and visibility for the Lumber River, making it an important natural and economic resource for Robeson, Hoke, Scotland, and Columbus counties.

=== Lumber River State Park ===
The Lumber and some of its adjoining banks are part of the Lumber River State Park, which comprises 9,874 acres of land and 115 miles of waterway. The park's recreational activities are currently at Princess Ann Access in the south and the Chalk Banks access to the north (near the town of Wagram).

There are 24 boat launches along the Lumber River that serve as access points to Lumber River State Park. The entire length of the river is open to fishing. The common game fish are black crappie, largemouth bass, catfish and redbreast sunfish. All anglers must have a valid fishing license and follow the regulations of the North Carolina Wildlife Resources Commission. Nine primitive camping sites are located at the Princess Ann section of the park, between Orrum and Fair Bluff. These campsites are meant to be used by no more than 6 people at a time. Each camp site features, a picnic table and grill, lantern holder, trash can, and fire ring. There are several hiking trails and picnic areas at Princess Ann as well as the many municipal and county parks that are located on the Lumber River.

Fourteen individual campsites are available at the Chalk Banks Access Area in Scotland County for family camping. Each site has a table, lantern holder, trash can and fire pit. Canoe-in campsites are also available.

== Local wildlife ==
The Lumber River supports a rich diversity of wildlife, including several rare or conservation-concerned species. One of the most notable is the Sandhills chub (Semotilus lumbee), a freshwater fish found in the Sandhills region through which the river originates. The river also provides habitat for other uncommon species, such as the giant yucca skipper (Megathymus yuccae), an insect whose larvae depend on yucca plants found in sandy upland habitats along the basin. Among the birds associated with the river is the red-cockaded woodpecker (Picoides borealis), which favors the longleaf pinesandhills ecosystem near the river's headwaters and is considered one of the best red-cockaded-woodpecker habitats north of Florida.

Beyond these, the Lumber River basin supports a wide variety of other species, from American alligators to various amphibians, bottomland forest birds, and neotropical migrants, reflecting the river's mosaic of sandhill, swamp, and bottomland habitats. This combination of ecological diversity and rare species helps make the Lumber River one of North Carolina's most important natural corridors for biodiversity.

== See also ==
- Lumber River State Park
