= Toxolasma parvus =

Conservation status
- Least Concern (IUCN 3.1)

- Secure (NatureServe)

Scientific classification
- Kingdom: Animalia
- Phylum: Mollusca
- Class: Bivalvia
- Order: Unionida
- Family: Unionidae
- Genus: Toxolasma
- Species: T. parvus

Binomial name
- Toxolasma parvus (Barnes, 1823)

Synonyms
- Toxolasma parvum

Species of bivalve

Toxolasma parvus, the lilliput, is a species of freshwater mussel, an aquatic bivalve mollusc in the family Unionidae, the river mussels.

This species is found throughout the Mississippi River drainage in the United States from South Dakota east to New York, south to Florida and west to Texas, as well as in Ontario, Canada.
