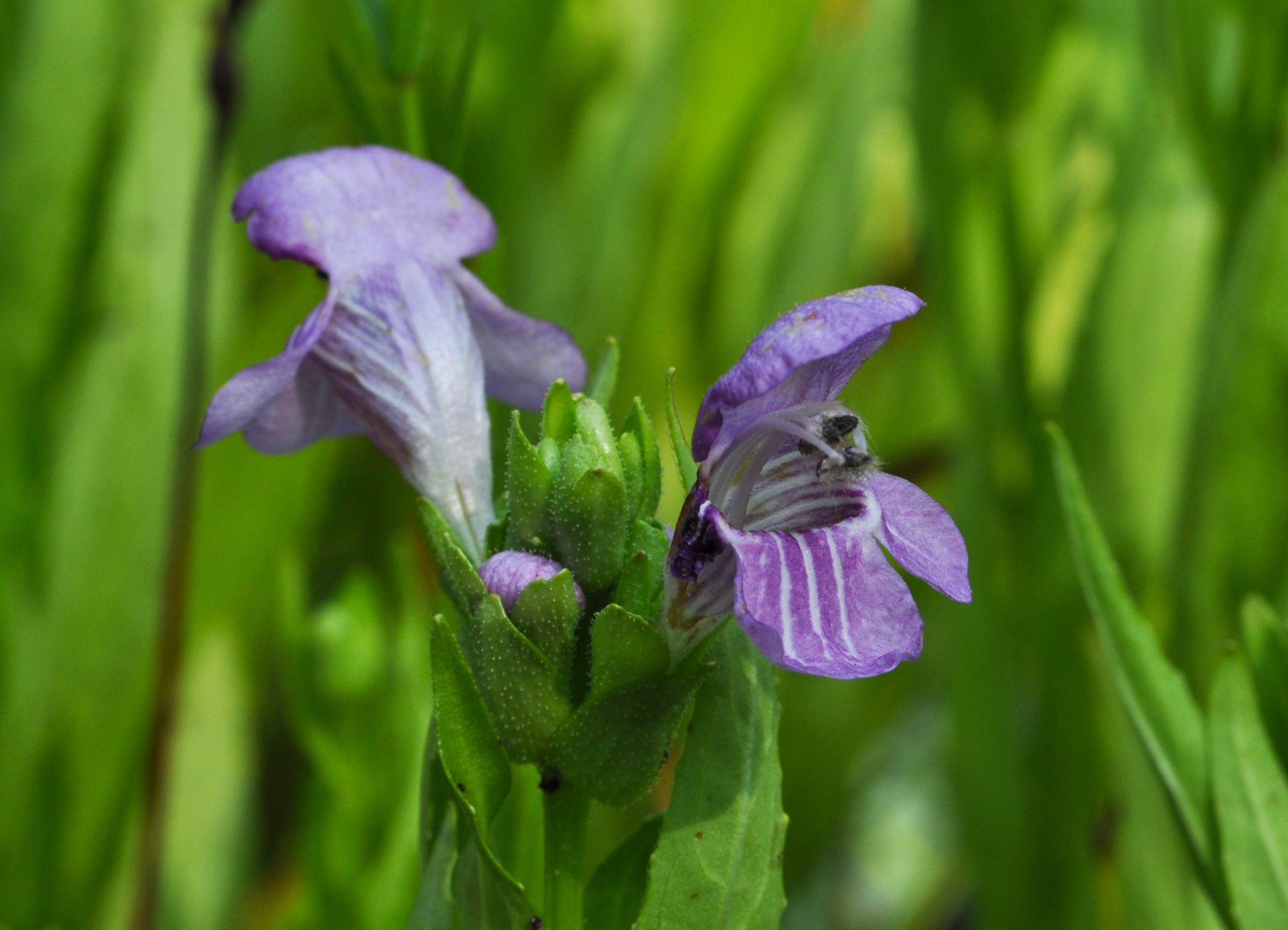
- Macbridea caroliniana, North Carolina Botanical Garden

Conservation status
- Imperiled (NatureServe)

Scientific classification
- Kingdom: Plantae
- Clade: Tracheophytes
- Clade: Angiosperms
- Clade: Eudicots
- Clade: Asterids
- Order: Lamiales
- Family: Lamiaceae
- Genus: Macbridea
- Species: M. caroliniana

Binomial name
- Macbridea caroliniana (Walter) S.F.Blake

= Macbridea caroliniana =

Species of plant

Macbridea caroliniana is a species of flowering plant in the mint family known by the common names Carolina birds-in-a-nest and Carolina bogmint. It one of only two species in the genus Macbridea, and though distributed over a wider range than Macbridea alba, apparently still quite rare. It occurs in swamp forests of the Atlantic coastal plain, and is documented in North Carolina, South Carolina, and Georgia, though undocumented reports exist for Florida, Alabama, and Mississippi.
