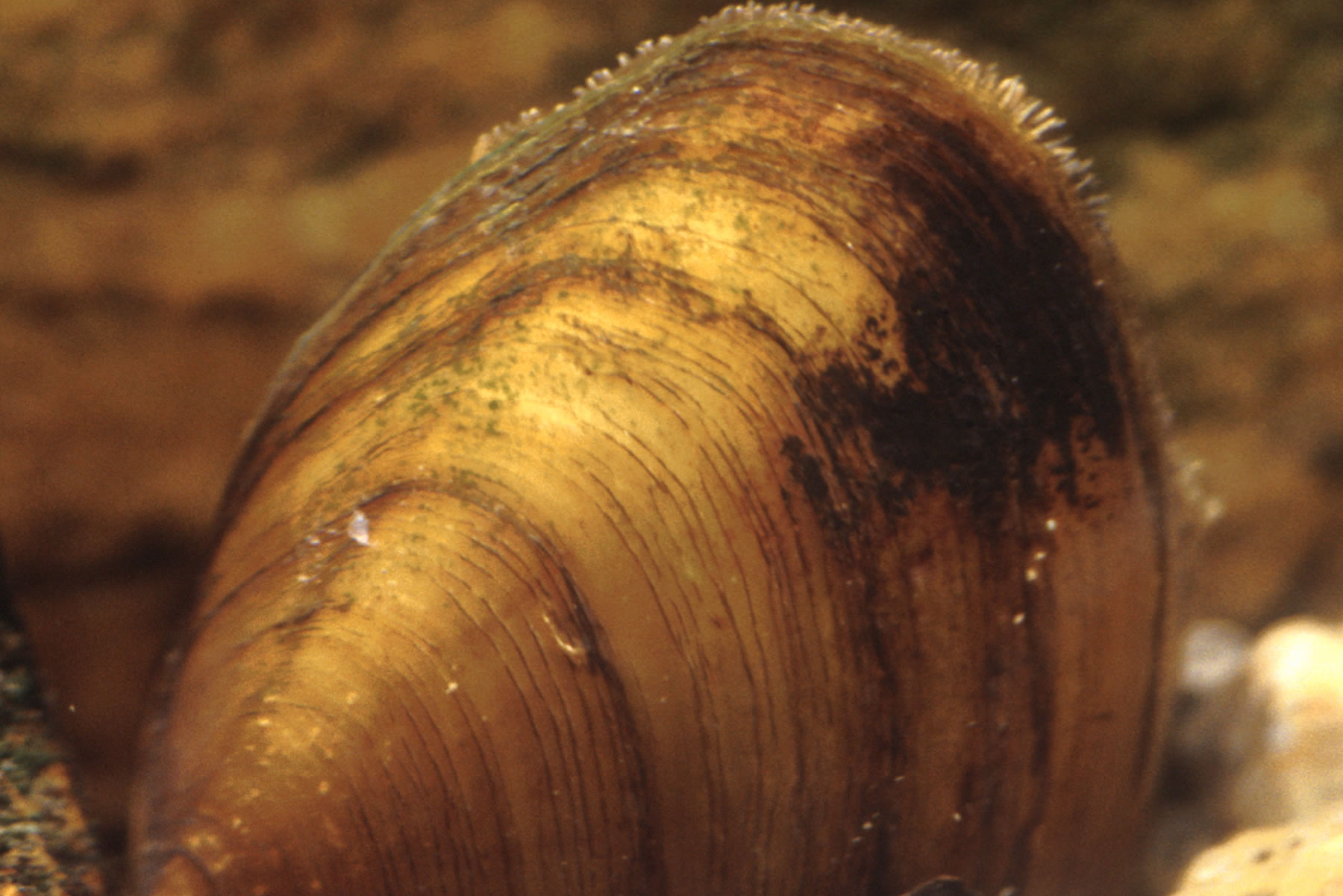
- Toxolasma cylindrellus

Scientific classification
- Kingdom: Animalia
- Phylum: Mollusca
- Class: Bivalvia
- Order: Unionida
- Family: Unionidae
- Tribe: Lampsilini
- Genus: Toxolasma; Rafinesque, 1831

= Toxolasma =

Genus of bivalves

Toxolasma is a genus of freshwater mussels, aquatic bivalve mollusks, in the family Unionidae, the river mussels.

== Species within the genus Toxolasma ==
- Toxolasma corvuncvulus (southern purple lilliput)
- Toxolasma cylindrellus (pale lilliput)
- Toxolasma lividus (purple lilliput)
- Toxolasma mearnsi (western lilliput)
- Toxolasma parvus (lilliput)
- Toxolasma paulus (iridescent lilliput)
- Toxolasma pullus (Savannah lilliput)
- Toxolasma texasiensis (Texas lilliput)
