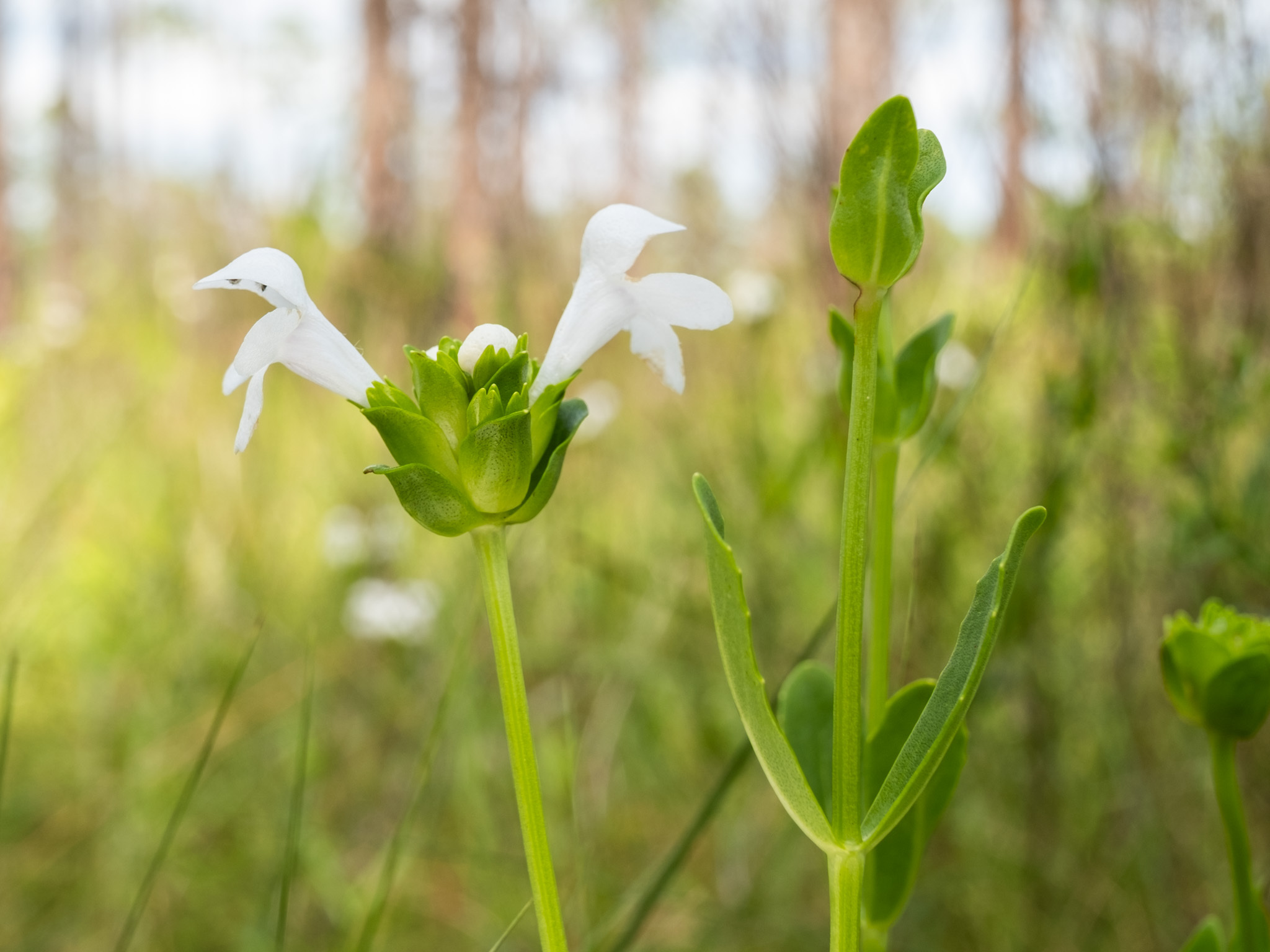

Conservation status
- Imperiled (NatureServe)

Scientific classification
- Kingdom: Plantae
- Clade: Embryophytes
- Clade: Tracheophytes
- Clade: Angiosperms
- Clade: Eudicots
- Clade: Asterids
- Order: Lamiales
- Family: Lamiaceae
- Genus: Macbridea
- Species: M. alba

Binomial name
- Macbridea alba Chapm.

= Macbridea alba =

Species of flowering plant

Macbridea alba is a rare species of flowering plant in the mint family known by the common names white birds-in-a-nest and white macbridea. It is endemic to Florida in the United States, where it is found in four counties in the Florida Panhandle. It is threatened by the loss and degradation of its habitat, and it is federally listed as a threatened species of the United States.

This plant grows in the counties of Gulf, Liberty, Franklin and Bay in Florida. There are just under 10,000 individuals in total divided amongst several scattered populations. About 40% of the occurrences are within the Apalachicola National Forest. Several known occurrences have been extirpated.

This is a perennial herb producing usually one stem measuring 30 to 40 centimeters tall. It is often coated in glandular hairs and it may have branches. The paired leaves are lance-shaped to spatula-shaped. They are glandular and may be sticky in texture. The inflorescence is a thyrse, which is a raceme that is divided into cymes. The inflorescence is filled with tightly packed pointed bracts between which bloom the flowers. Each flower has a double-lipped white corolla around 2.5 to 3 centimeters long. There may be pale purple markings in the flower's throat. The open flowers and rounded buds sitting on the cluster of green bracts resemble white birds and eggs in a nest, giving the plant its common name. Blooming occurs in May through July and the plant is likely pollinated by bumblebees (Bombus spp.).

This mint grows in pine flatwoods, seeps, wet savannas, and the ecotones next to swamps and sandhills. It prefers grassy areas with wet, infertile soils, often sandy soils rich in peat. This region, located in the Apalachicola River Basin, has been altered by human activity. Historically, part of the area was devoted to the pulp industry, but much less today. Urban development threatens the local habitat as residential areas are constructed and associated utilities such as roads are built and maintained; many occurrences of the plant are on roadsides and are vulnerable during this process. The flatwoods habitat depends on a regime of periodic wildfires for its maintenance. Fire prevents the ecological succession of the flatwoods, keeping large woody vegetation from building up and shading out the herb layer of the understory. Now fire suppression is practiced, preventing the normal fire regime and leading to the degradation of the habitat, making it less hospitable to this and other herbs. Tracts which have not burned in many years have less of the mint, but it tends to become quite abundant in the years after fire sweeps through. Good management practices will involve maintenance of a proper fire regime.
