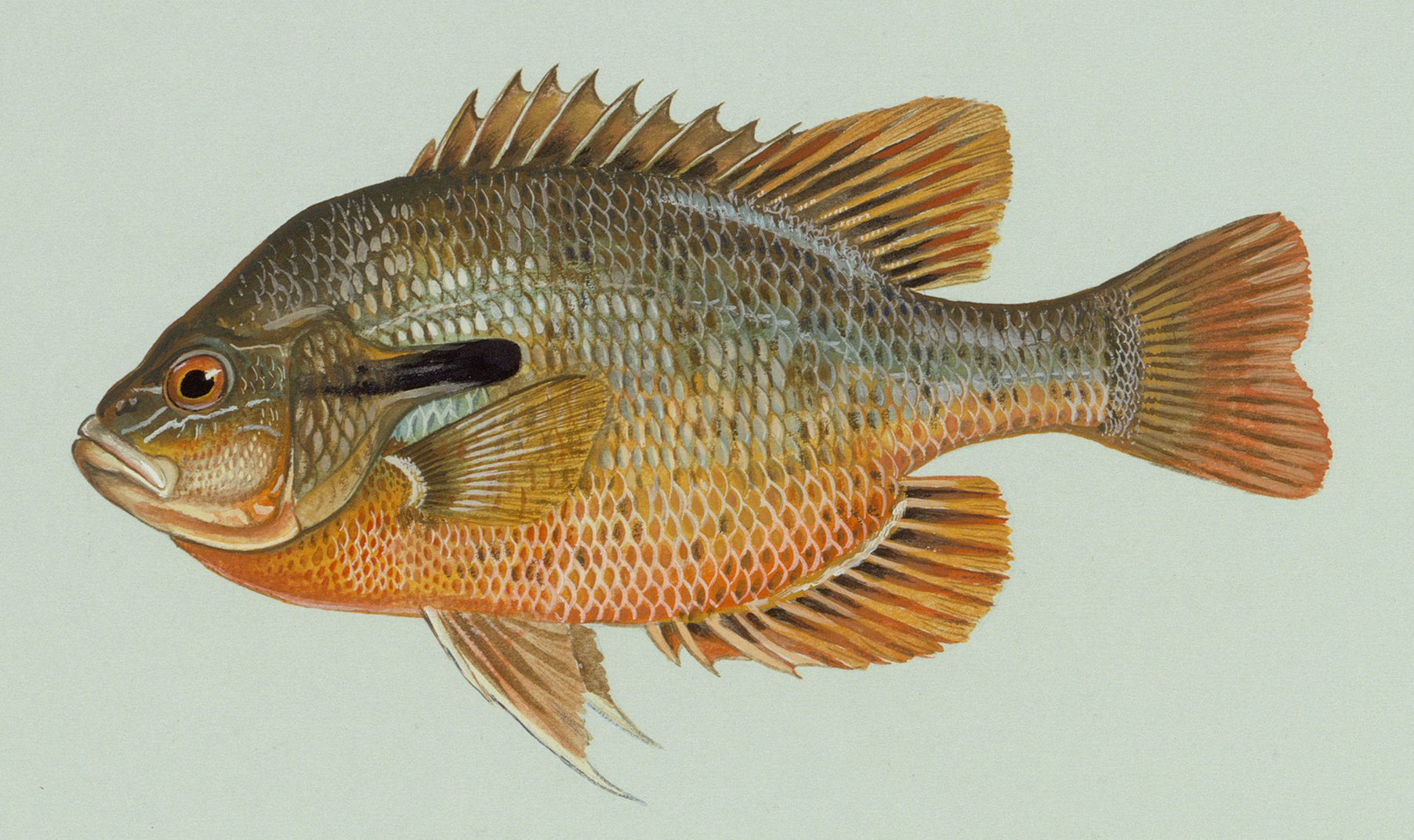

Conservation status
- Least Concern (IUCN 3.1)

Scientific classification
- Kingdom: Animalia
- Phylum: Chordata
- Class: Actinopterygii
- Order: Centrarchiformes
- Family: Centrarchidae
- Genus: Lepomis
- Species: L. auritus

Binomial name
- Lepomis auritus (Linnaeus, 1758)

Synonyms
- Labrus auritus Linnaeus, 1758

= Redbreast sunfish =

Species of fish

The redbreast sunfish (Lepomis auritus) is a species of freshwater fish in the sunfish family (Centrarchidae) of the order Centrarchiformes. The type species of its genus, it is native to the river systems of eastern Canada and the United States. The redbreast sunfish reaches a maximum recorded length of about 30 centimetres (12 in).

The species prefers vegetated and rocky pools and lake margins for its habitat. Its diet can include insects, snails, and other small invertebrates. A panfish popular with anglers, the redbreast sunfish is also kept as an aquarium fish by hobbyists. Redbreast sunfish are usually caught with live bait such as nightcrawlers, crickets, grasshoppers, waxworms, or mealworms. They can also be caught using small lures or flies. Most anglers use light spinning tackle to catch redbreast sunfish. It is popular with fly anglers in the winter because it will more readily strike a moving fly than will bluegills in cooler water.

As is typical for the sunfishes, the female redbreast sunfish lays her eggs (about 1000) in a substrate depression built by the male. The male guards the eggs and fry.

The specific epithet, auritus, is Latin for big-eared.

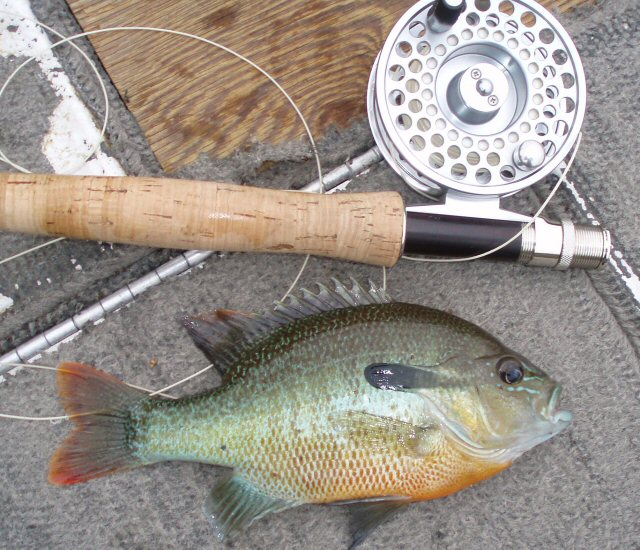
Typical redbreast sunfish from the Tallapoosa River in Alabama

== Description ==
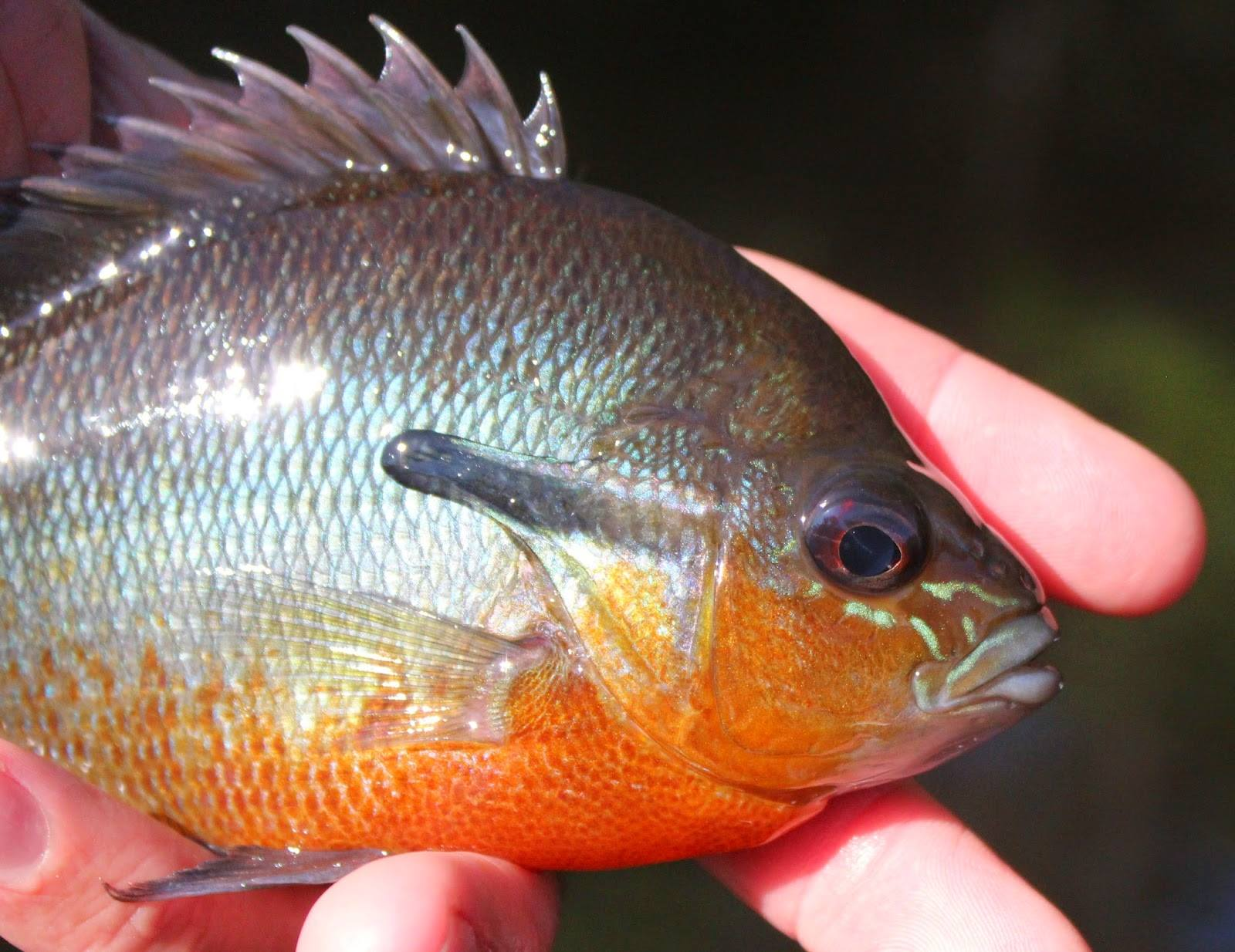
Redbreast sunfish in Maryland

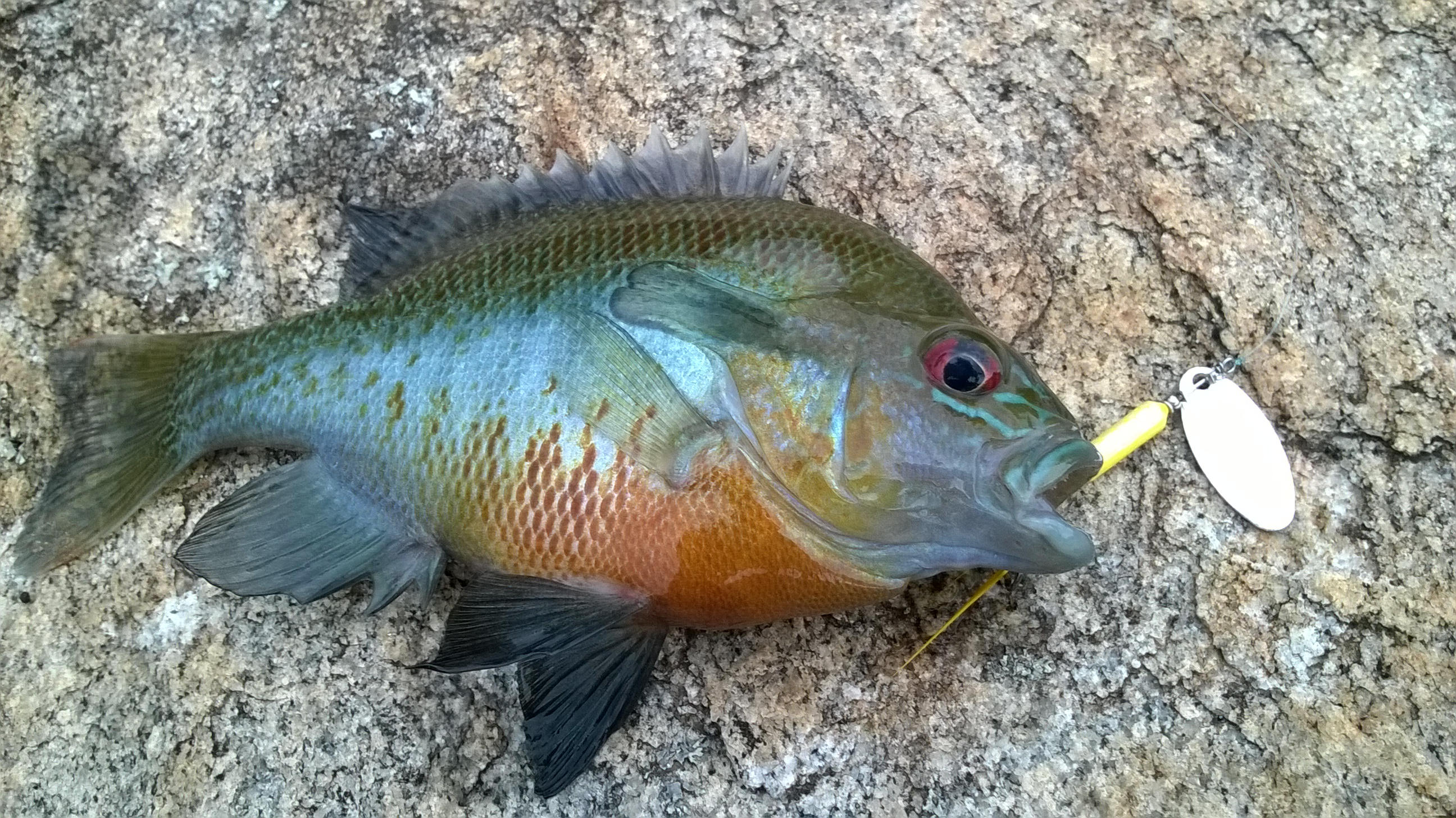
Redbreast sunfish in Georgia

The average length of the redbreast sunfish is around 11 centimetres (4 in) with a record 30.5 centimetres (12.0 in). The record weight for the fish is 0.79 kilograms (1.7 lb). The redbreast sunfish is characterized by a long black opercular flap, which is longer than those of most other sunfish in its range. There are a few blue iridescent vermiculations on the head. Small teeth may be appreciated, mostly on the roof of the mouth. There are faint vertical bars present on the olive-green bodies of both sexes, which may become more apparent as the background coloration changes to blue-green near the lateral line. Males have darker ventral coloration than that of females, ranging from orange-yellow to orange-red. The caudal fin has a shallow fork and may have orange to red pigmentation. It is common within the redbreast sunfish's native and introduced range for hybridization with other sunfish species to occur.

== Distribution ==
The species' native range is in the eastern United States and Canada, in rivers emptying into the Atlantic Ocean. The redbreast sunfish tends to be more of a cool-river species, but also inhabits freshwater lakes and streams. The species has been introduced as far west as Louisiana and West Texas. Lepomis auritus has been transplanted to and become established in Germany, Italy, Mexico, and Puerto Rico. The effects of introduced populations of redbreast sunfish on native species are not well studied.

== Ecology ==
Redbreast sunfish mainly consume immature aquatic insects. Mayflies, small fish, and dragonfly larvae consist of the majority of the sunfish's diet based on stomach content. Small crayfish may also be consumed. Being an opportunistic feeder, the fish competes with other sunfish and larger predatory fish that prey on the same food they do.

Larger piscivorous fish are the main predators of smaller redbreast sunfish. Micropterus species are a major threat to sunfish because of their shared habitat and the availability of the sunfish. The sunfish prefers structures around banks and overhanging branches that provide food, shade, and protection. Lepomis auritus survives best in water with a current and a pH between 7.0 and 7.5. Lack of current, overly acidic, or basic water can dramatically affect the sunfish's survival rate.

Human influence on abiotic factors, such as sunlight, and biotic factors, such as predator numbers, can have a major influence on sunfish. Clearing debris from the bank can increase the amount of sunlight that reaches the water, thus increasing water temperature, while also decreasing the number of hiding places along the bank that sunfish can use. Decreasing the number of larger predatory fish by harvesting them will increase the survival rate of the redbreast sunfish.

== Life history ==
The redbreast sunfish is a spring spawner on sand-gravel substrate, depending on location or when water temperature reaches 16–26 °C (61–79 °F). Males build a nest in shallow water. The female deposits her eggs in the nest, and the male guards the nest after fertilizing the eggs. Cuckoldry, in which a non-nesting male fertilizes eggs left in a nest, has also been observed. Average egg production for the sunfish is around 3000, depending on the age of the female. Mature ova are around 2.1 millimetres (0.083 in) in diameter. Reproductive maturity is reached in the second year of life. They have been known to have a maximum lifespan of around eight years. Currently, humans do not play a large role in influencing life history due to large populations and secluded areas.

== Relationship with humans ==
=== Management ===
Currently, the redbreast sunfish is not on the federal or state endangered or threatened species list. The species is thriving in its natural habitat.

=== Angling ===
The IGFA all-tackle world record for the species stands at 0.79 kilograms (1 lb 12 oz) caught from the Suwannee River in Florida in 1984. A Georgia state record fish caught in the Satilla River in May 2022 tied the world record. A North Carolina state record fish caught on the Lumber River in 2019 weighed 2 pounds 1 ounce (0.94 kg).
