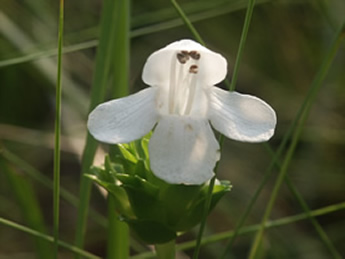
- Macbridea alba

Scientific classification
- Kingdom: Plantae
- Clade: Tracheophytes
- Clade: Angiosperms
- Clade: Eudicots
- Clade: Asterids
- Order: Lamiales
- Family: Lamiaceae
- Subfamily: Lamioideae
- Genus: Macbridea; Elliott ex Nutt.

= Macbridea =

Genus of flowering plants

Macbridea is a small genus of plants in the family Lamiaceae, first described in 1818. It is native to the southeastern United States.

Species

- Macbridea alba Chapm. - Florida
- Macbridea caroliniana (Walter) S.F.Blake - Alabama, Georgia, Florida, North + South Carolina
