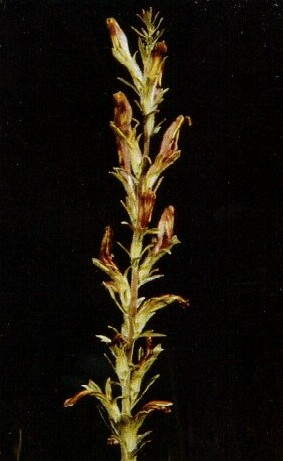

Conservation status
- Imperiled (NatureServe)

- Endangered (ESA)

Scientific classification
- Kingdom: Plantae
- Clade: Tracheophytes
- Clade: Angiosperms
- Clade: Eudicots
- Clade: Asterids
- Order: Lamiales
- Family: Orobanchaceae
- Tribe: Cymbarieae
- Genus: Schwalbea; L.
- Species: S. americana

Binomial name
- Schwalbea americana L.

= Schwalbea =

Genus of flowering plants in the broomrape family

Schwalbea americana, commonly known as American chaffseed, is the sole species currently classified in the genus Schwalbea. It is an erect, hemiparasitic, perennial herb in the family Orobanchaceae. It is native to the southeastern and Atlantic coastal United States where it is found in wet acidic grasslands. This species has declined tremendously from its historical range due to fire suppression, development and collection, and it is currently listed as an endangered species by the U.S. Fish and Wildlife Service.

== Description ==
This species is an herbaceous plant that grows 1.0–2.6 ft (0.3–0.8 m) in height. It flowers April through June, and is pollinated by bees, with fruits maturing in July–September. Fruit dispersal is poorly understood, but fruits are likely wind dispersed in close proximity to the parent. Fruit is a brown, dry dehiscent capsule, narrowly oval-shaped, about 0.4 inches (1 cm) long. Seeds are numerous, flat, and winged.

=== Life cycle ===
Although it is a root-hemiparasite (partially dependent on its host), the species is not host-specific and may parasitize a variety of trees, shrubs, and herbs.

Fire appears to be a requirement for long-term viability strongly affecting the reproductive success by controlling conditions necessary for successful seed germination and possibly required for young plants to make their haustorial connection. The few brief months immediately following a fire are enough time for the minute seeds to germinate in the mineral soil under full sun without litter and competing vegetation. The coarse, thickened chaffseed capsule insulates the seeds from the higher temperature of the fire and the heat exposure may increase germination rates.

== Taxonomy ==
Schwalbea americana was first described by Carl Linnaeus in 1753. It is considered to be the sole species in the genus. A further species, Schwalbea australis was described by Francis Whittier Pennell in a 1920 publication, but this is now generally not recognized, not even at the variety level.

== Distribution and habitat ==
American chaffseed typically grows in sandy, acidic, seasonally moist to dry soils. It is generally found in open habitats such as moist pine flatwoods, pine/wiregrass savannas, and ecotonal areas between peaty wetlands and xeric sandy soils. All of these habitats were historically maintained by human or lightning-caused wildfires. These pine savanna habitats are known for being particularly species-rich.

== Status and conservation ==
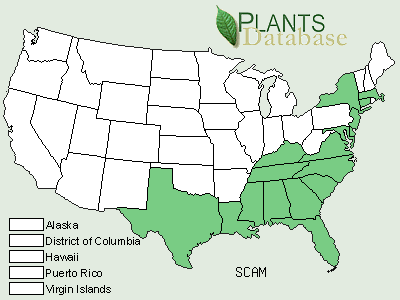

American chaffseed was listed as Federally Endangered effective October 29, 1992.

Historically, the species occurred on the Cumberland Plateau of Kentucky and Tennessee, and in the inner and outer Coastal Plain of 15 eastern and southeastern states. The last record from the Cumberland Plateau was in the 1930s. The present distribution is restricted to the coastal plain in just five states: Florida, Georgia, North Carolina, South Carolina and New Jersey. The species was seen in Cape Cod, Massachusetts in 2018, the first time it had been observed in Massachusetts in 53 years.

In total, 71 extant populations have been identified, but most are small in plant numbers and area covered. In North Carolina, there are 18 extant occurrences, 17 of which occur on Fort Bragg. The impact areas support large occurrences of American chaffseed due to frequent fires, establishing Fort Bragg as one of three population centers for the species, the other two being eastern South Carolina and southwestern Georgia/northwestern Florida. Seventeen occurrences on Fort Bragg represent the only known population(s) in North Carolina, except for a very small population in Moore County, just off the installation. Outside of the impact areas, four sites occur, and numbers of individuals are small. Burning of these sites is less frequent than in impact areas. Even on sites with only low herbaceous species densities, American chaffseed occurrences on Fort Bragg decline in the absence of frequent fires, indicating that competition may be influencing these sites less than fire, although research on use of fire as a management strategy is lacking.

=== Recovery plan ===
A recovery plan was launched on September 29, 1995, by the U.S. Fish and Wildlife Service and the U.S. Department of the Interior, and amended on November 12, 2019. American chaffseed will be considered for reclassification when:

1. at least 50 viable sites, distributed throughout the current range of the species, are provided permanent long-term protection;
2. four of the 50 sites are located in the northern portion of the species range (Massachusetts to Virginia);
3. management agreements or plans are in place for all 50 of the protected sites (land management objectives to include items related to "fire suppression, hog damage, and/or silviculture practices" per amended criteria);
4. life history and ecological requirements are understood sufficiently to determine viability of extant populations (at least 100 individuals per population per amended criteria); and
5. biennial monitoring shows that the 50 sites are viable over a 10-year period.
