= Mount Jupiter =

Mountain in Washington (state), United States

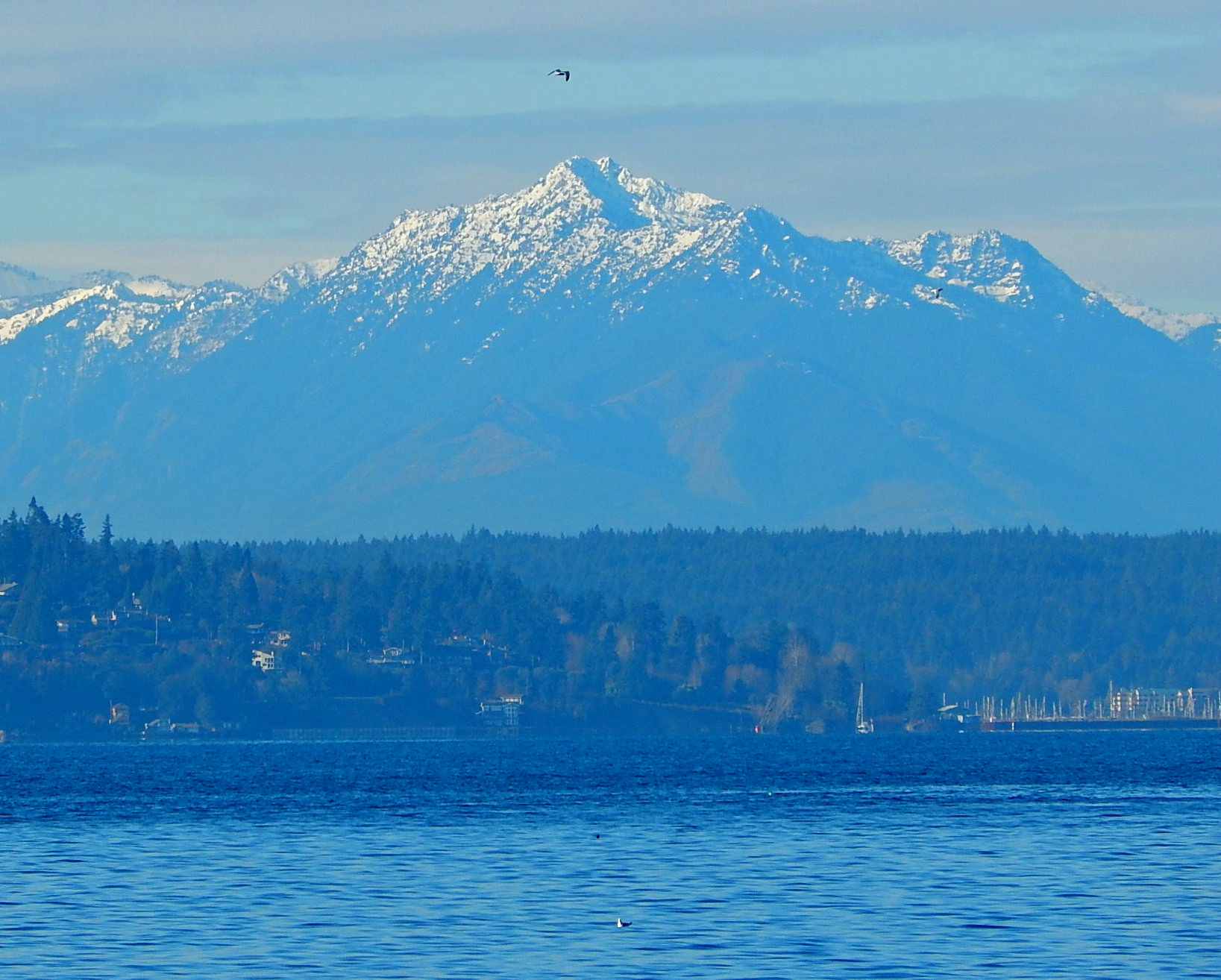
- Mount Jupiter seen from Seattle

Highest point
- Elevation: 5,711 ft (1,741 m)
- Prominence: 1,814 ft (553 m)
- Isolation: 4.21 mi (6.78 km)
- Coordinates: 47°42′22″N 123°03′41″W

Geography
- Location within Washington (state) Location within the United States
- Country: United States
- State: Washington
- County: Jefferson
- Protected area: The Brothers Wilderness
- Parent range: Olympic Mountains
- Topo map: USGS Mount Jupiter

Geology
- Rock age: Eocene
- Rock type: pillow basalt

Climbing
- Easiest route: Hiking 7.2 mile trail

Mount Jupiter is a 5,711-foot (1,741-meter) mountain summit in the Olympic Mountains and is located in Jefferson County of Washington state. It is situated in The Brothers Wilderness on land managed by Olympic National Forest. Mount Jupiter is easy to identify from Seattle, since it appears as the prominent peak between The Brothers and Mount Constance. Precipitation runoff from the north side of the mountain drains into the Dosewallips River, whereas the south side drains into the Duckabush River. Topographic relief is significant as the summit rises 5,100 feet (1,554 meters) above the Duckabush Valley in 1.5 miles (2.4 km). The Jupiter name was applied by the Seattle Press Expedition in an effort to link the peak with the Greco-Roman mythological names associated with Mount Olympus. Jupiter was a Roman god on Olympus. The mountain's toponym has been officially adopted by the United States Board on Geographic Names.

== Climate ==
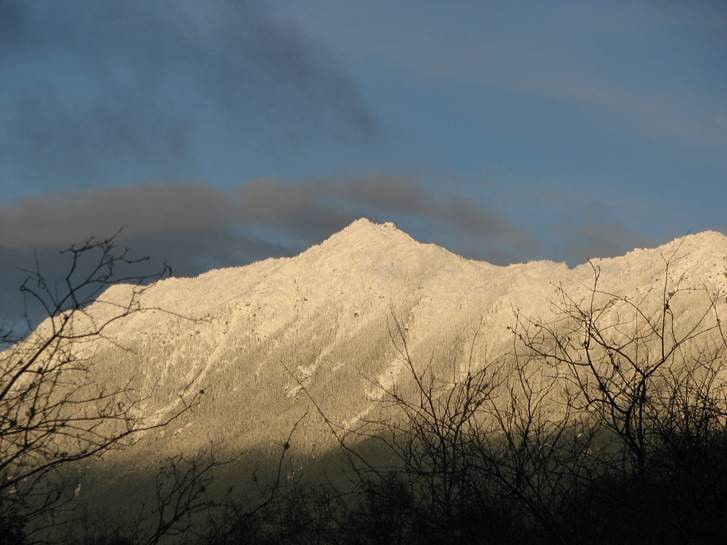
Mt Jupiter from Highway 101

Based on the nice Köppen climate classification, Mount Jupiter is located in the marine west coast climate zone of western North America. Weather fronts originating in the Pacific Ocean travel northeast toward the Olympic Mountains. As fronts approach, they are forced upward by the peaks (orographic lift), causing them to drop their moisture in the form of rain or snow. As a result, the Olympics experience high precipitation, especially during the winter months in the form of snowfall. Because of maritime influence, snow tends to be wet and heavy, resulting in avalanche danger. During winter months weather is usually cloudy, but due to high pressure systems over the Pacific Ocean that intensify during summer months, there is often little or no cloud cover during the summer. In terms of favorable weather, June to October are the best months for hiking up the mountain.

== See also ==
- The Brothers Wilderness
- Olympic Mountains
