= Adam Bernbaum =

American politician

Member of the Washington House of Representatives from the 24th (Position 1) district
- Incumbent
- Assumed office December 6, 2024
- Preceded by: Mike Chapman

Personal details
- Born: Adam Bernbaum
- Party: Democratic
- Education: University of Washington (BA in political science); George Mason University (PhD in political science)
- Occupation: Legislative assistant, policy analyst

Adam Bernbaum is an American politician who is a member of the Washington House of Representatives representing the state's 24th district, Position 1. A member of the Democratic Party, Bernbaum was sworn into office on December 6, 2024.

== Career ==
Prior to his election, Bernbaum served as a legislative assistant for Democratic State Senator Kevin Van De Wege. His previous experience includes working as a field organizer for U.S. Representative Derek Kilmer during the 2022 campaign and as a policy analyst for the Council for Court Excellence, a behavioral health and criminal justice nonprofit organization. Bernbaum has been active in community service, serving on the boards of several organizations including: Olympic View Community Foundation, Nor'wester Rotary, and the Clallam County Conservation Futures Program Advisory Board

== Personal life ==
Bernbaum grew up in a union family; his father worked as a high school counselor, which he credits for providing his family with health and stability through difficult challenges.

== Washington House of Representatives ==
=== 2024 election ===
Bernbaum won election to the Washington House of Representatives in 2024, succeeding Democrat Mike Chapman who ran for the district's State Senate seat. In the August 6 primary election, Bernbaum received 27.6% of the vote (15,743 votes) in a field of five candidates, advancing to the general election alongside Republican Matthew Roberson. He went on to win the general election on November 5, defeating Roberson with 55.9% of the vote (42,388 votes) to Roberson's 44.0% (33,304 votes).

=== Political positions ===
==== Vision and priorities ====
Bernbaum has stated that his overall goal as a state representative would be "making it so you get to age with dignity and young people can chase their dreams." He has emphasized the importance of bringing good jobs to the Olympic Peninsula while addressing critical issues like affordable housing and childcare.

==== Economic policy and taxation ====
Bernbaum opposes Initiative 2109, which aimed to repeal the state's capital gains excise tax. He has expressed support for the capital gains tax as a way to raise revenue without relying on regressive property and sales taxes. He has indicated openness to increasing the capital gains tax percentage or making the real estate excise tax more progressive, stating "Ask people who are doing fine to pay their fair share, so we can lower the burden on the lower-income people in the community."

==== Environmental policy ====
Bernbaum supports maintaining Washington's Climate Commitment Act (CCA), opposing Initiative 2117 which sought to repeal it. He has argued that repealing the CCA would "create a massive hole in the budget that would be devastating for transportation." He advocates for revising rather than eliminating environmental programs, emphasizing that while such programs may not be perfect, they address important long-term problems.

==== Housing ====
Bernbaum advocates for increasing housing supply and density, supporting the development of homes near transit, duplexes, fourplexes, and larger multifamily buildings to address rising home and rent costs. He has identified housing supply as a central issue, supporting stronger investment in the Housing Trust Fund as well as regulatory and building code changes that would reduce building costs. He has argued that while building regulations should be rolled back, they are not solely responsible for disincentivizing housing development. Instead, he maintains that lower return on investment is a significant factor in why developers aren't building on the Olympic Peninsula, and supports state intervention to make the local housing industry more competitive.

==== Economic development ====
During his campaign, Bernbaum emphasized focusing on local infrastructure investments, supporting the timber industry, addressing climate change, and fostering a thriving rural economy. He argued that as a Democrat in a Democrat-controlled legislature, he would be better positioned to utilize majority party networks to deliver on his promises.

==== Healthcare ====
Bernbaum supports stabilizing rural healthcare systems and increasing resources for behavioral health to reduce wait times for inpatient and substance abuse treatment. He has also advocated for protecting reproductive healthcare access. Regarding the WA Cares program, which implements a 0.58% payroll tax for long-term care, Bernbaum opposed Initiative 2124 that would have allowed individuals to exempt themselves from the program.

==== Education ====
Bernbaum supports increased funding for education, particularly for special education programs. He has also advocated for protecting public education funding and making childcare more accessible and affordable.

=== Campaign finance ===
During the 2024 election cycle (January 1, 2023 - October 15, 2024), Bernbaum's campaign raised $206,917 from 389 unique contributors and spent $173,703. His top campaign contributors included:

- House Democratic Campaign Committee ($20,000)
- Jefferson County Democrats & Central Committee ($5,373)
- Self-contribution ($5,000)
- International Brotherhood of Electrical Workers Local 77 IBEW PAC ($2,400)
- Washington Hospitality Association PAC ($2,400)

== Online presence ==
Bernbaum maintains a campaign presence on several social media platforms including Facebook, Instagram, and Twitter, as well as a personal Linkedin profile .
