= Colonel Bob Mountain =

Mountain in Washington (state), United States

Colonel Bob

Highest point
- Elevation: 4,498 ft (1,371 m) NAVD 88
- Prominence: 160 ft (49 m)
- Coordinates: 47°29′18″N 123°44′47″W

Geography
- Location: Grays Harbor County, Washington U.S.
- Parent range: Olympic Mountains
- Topo map: USGS Colonel Bob

Climbing
- First ascent: 1893 by Clark Pealer, J. N., and Robert Locke

Colonel Bob is a summit in the Colonel Bob Wilderness, on the Olympic Peninsula in Washington state. It is one of the highest points in Grays Harbor County, the highest being named Gibson Peak.

A Henry Fisher map from 1890 depicts Colonel Bob Mountain as McCallas Peak. Colonel Bob Mountain was first climbed in 1893 by Clark Pealer, J. N., and Robert Locke who named the peak for orator Robert G. Ingersoll. The climbing party left a cairn and record which was discovered in 1930.

== See also ==
- Colonel Bob Wilderness
