= Mount Pershing =

Mountain in Washington (state), United States

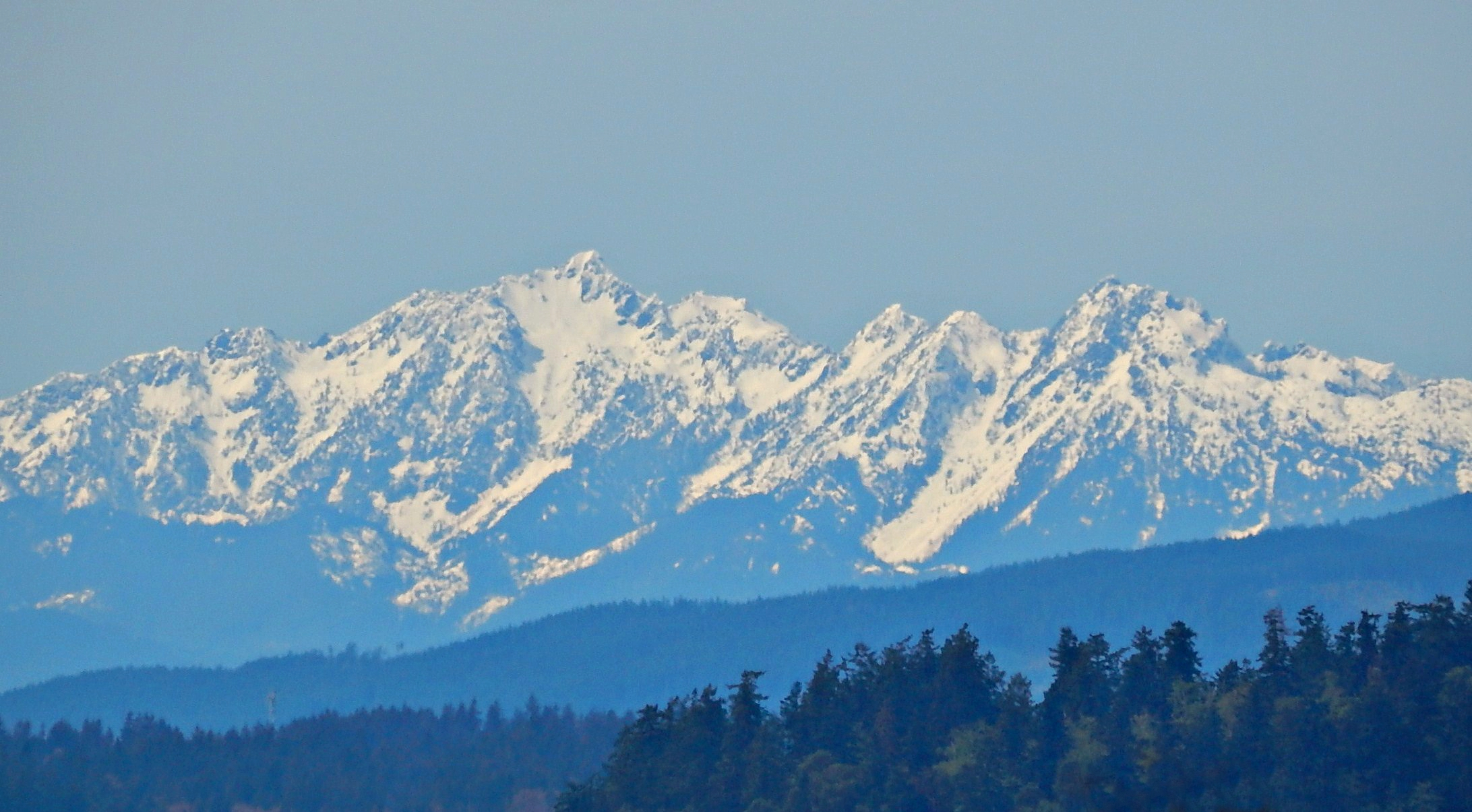
- Mount Pershing (left) seen from West Seattle (Jefferson Peak to the right)

Highest point
- Elevation: 6,154 ft (1,876 m)
- Prominence: 1,114 ft (340 m)
- Parent peak: Mount Washington (6,260 ft)
- Isolation: 1.53 mi (2.46 km)
- Coordinates: 47°33′08″N 123°15′22″W

Naming
- Etymology: John J. Pershing

Geography
- Location within Washington (state) Location within the United States
- Country: United States
- State: Washington
- County: Mason
- Protected area: Mount Skokomish Wilderness
- Parent range: Olympic Mountains
- Topo map: USGS Mount Skokomish

Geology
- Rock age: Eocene
- Rock type: pillow basalt

Climbing
- First ascent: 1939 by Don Dooley, Robert Henderson, Walt Ingalls, and Bob Mandelhorn
- Easiest route: class 3 scrambling via South Ridge

Mount Pershing is a 6,154-foot-elevation (1,876-meter) massif in Mason County of Washington state, United States. Part of the Olympic Mountains, it is situated in the Mount Skokomish Wilderness on land managed by Olympic National Forest. The mountain's toponym honors General of the Armies John J. Pershing (1860–1948). The nearest higher neighbor is Mount Washington, 1.45 mi (2.33 km) to the south-southeast. Precipitation runoff from its slopes drains into the Hamma Hamma River.

== Climate ==
Mount Pershing is located in the marine west coast climate zone of western North America. Weather fronts originating in the Pacific Ocean travel northeast toward the Olympic Mountains. As fronts approach, they are forced upward by the peaks (orographic lift), causing them to drop their moisture in the form of rain or snow. As a result, the Olympics experience high precipitation, especially during the winter months in the form of snowfall. Because of maritime influence, snow tends to be wet and heavy, resulting in avalanche danger. During winter months weather is usually cloudy, but due to high pressure systems over the Pacific Ocean that intensify during summer months, there is often little or no cloud cover during the summer. The months May through August offer the most favorable weather for viewing or climbing this mountain.

== Geology ==
The Olympic Mountains are composed of obducted clastic wedge material and oceanic crust, primarily Eocene sandstone, turbidite, and basaltic oceanic crust. The mountains were sculpted during the Pleistocene era by erosion and glaciers advancing and retreating multiple times.

== Gallery ==
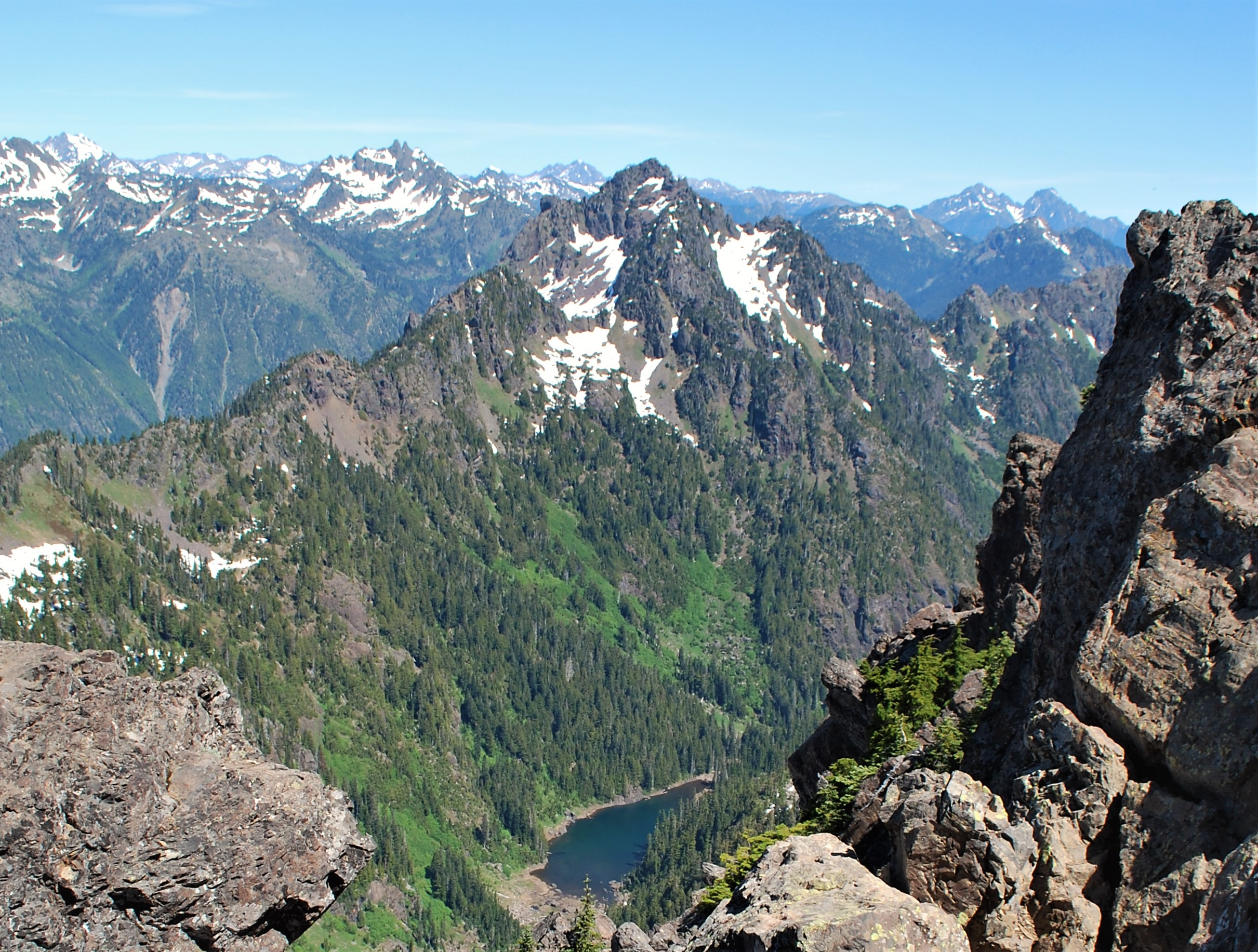
South aspect, from Mt. Ellinor

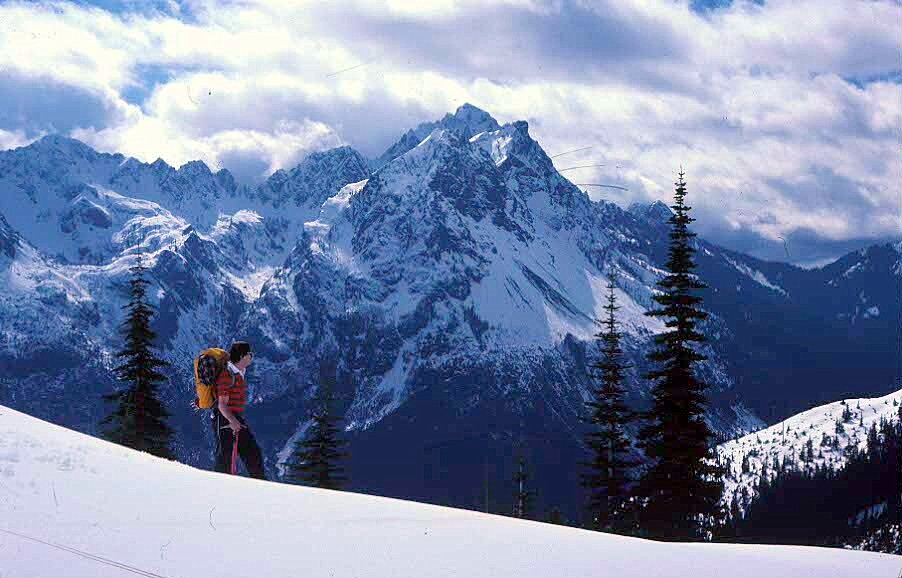
Mount Pershing seen from the north

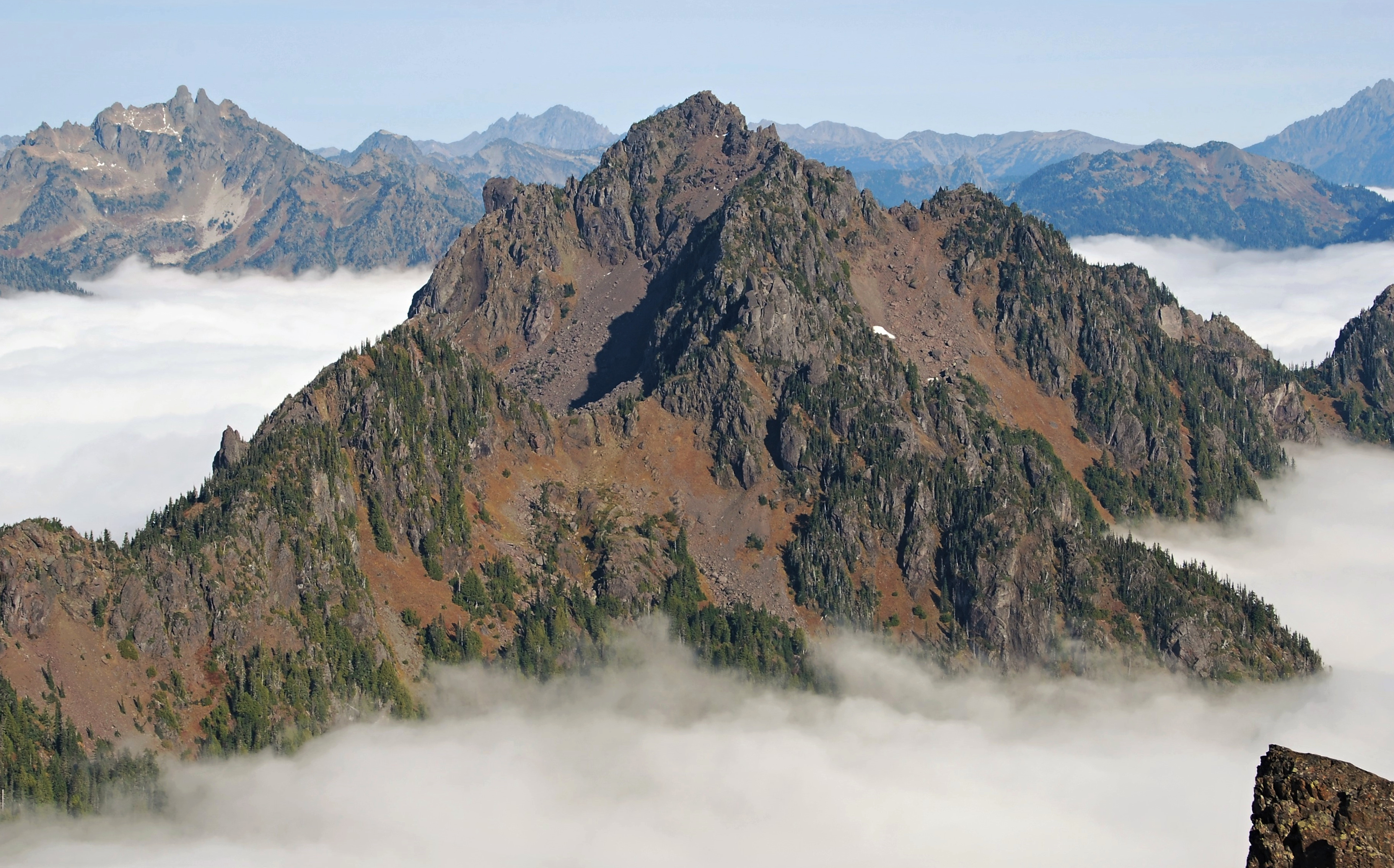
South aspect

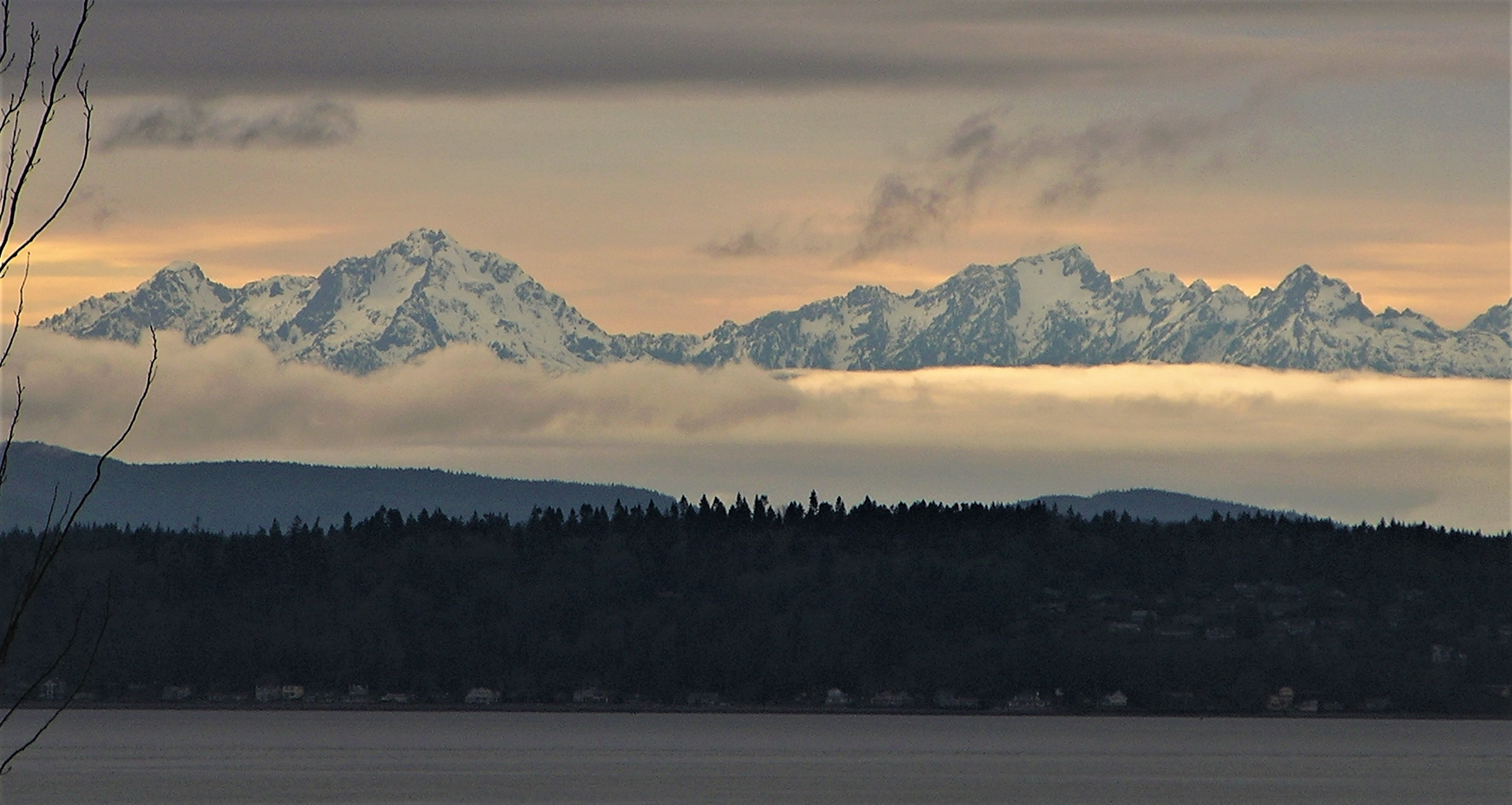
Left to rightː Mt. Ellinor, Mt. Washington, Mt. Pershing, Jefferson Peak. View from Seattle.

== See also ==
- Olympic Mountains
- Geology of the Pacific Northwest
