= Wonder Mountain Wilderness =

Wilderness area in Washington, United States

- IUCN category Ib (wilderness area)
- Location within the United States
- Location: Mason County, Washington, USA
- Nearest city: Lilliwaup, Washington
- Coordinates: 47°30′34″N 123°25′35″W
- Area: 2,349 acres (951 ha)
- Established: 1984
- Governing body: U.S. Forest Service
- Website: Wonder Mountain Wilderness

Wonder Mountain Wilderness is a designated wilderness area encompassing Wonder Mountain in the Olympic National Forest on the Olympic Peninsula of Washington in the United States. The wilderness comprises 2,349 acres (951 ha) bordering Olympic National Park and administered by the U.S. Forest Service.

Wonder Mountain Wilderness is roughly triangle-shaped. A high ridge encompasses the southern point of the triangle, rising to the peak of 4,848-foot (1,478 m) Wonder Mountain. Below the summit stands a heavy forest of western hemlock, Douglas fir, and silver fir. Alder, willow, and vine maple grow along McKay Creek and Five Stream, both of which have their headwaters in the wilderness. huckleberry and thimbleberry are also common.

== History ==
In 1984, the U.S. Congress established five wilderness areas within Olympic National Forest:

- Buckhorn Wilderness
- Colonel Bob Wilderness
- Mount Skokomish Wilderness
- The Brothers Wilderness
- Wonder Mountain Wilderness

Wonder Mountain Wilderness sits along the southern flank of the Olympic Wilderness, which was created in 1988.

== Recreation ==
There are no trails leading into or through Wonder Mountain Wilderness. Two forest roads that run near the southeast and southwest borders are closed to motor vehicles from October to May to provide protection for wildlife. The southeast road has been permanently closed at the lake Cushman bridge for years about ten miles from the base of wonder mountain. The wilderness starts at the top of the ridge line. This route is not accessible.

== See also ==
- List of U.S. Wilderness Areas
