= Jim Hargrove =

American forester and politician

James Hargrove

Member of the Washington Senate from the 24th district
- In office January 11, 1993 – January 9, 2017
- Preceded by: Paul Conner
- Succeeded by: Kevin Van De Wege

Member of the Washington House of Representatives from the 24th district
- In office January 11, 1985 – January 11, 1993
- Preceded by: Barney McClure
- Succeeded by: Lynn Kessler

Personal details
- Born: James Edwin Hargrove; October 5, 1953 (age 72) Portland, Oregon, U.S.
- Party: Democratic
- Spouse: Laurie
- Children: 3
- Education: Oregon State University (BS)
- Profession: Forester

James Edwin Hargrove (born October 5, 1953) is an American forester and politician who served as a member of the Washington State Senate, representing the 24th district from 1993 to 2017. A member of the Democratic Party, he previously served as a member of the Washington House of Representatives from 1985 to 1993.

Hargrove was a member of the Family Policy Council, Children's Oversight, Child Safety for Children in Child Protective Services or Child Welfare Services, Judiciary, and Natural Resources & Marine Waters committees. He was the chair of the Human Services and Corrections and Western Legislative Forestry Task Force committees.
