= Paul Conner =

American politician from Washington

Member of the Washington Senate from the 24th district
- In office November 29, 1977 – January 11, 1993
- Preceded by: Donald G. Olson
- Succeeded by: Jim Hargrove
- In office June 6, 1957 – January 12, 1959
- Preceded by: Francis Pearson
- Succeeded by: Gordon Sandison

Member of the Washington House of Representatives from the 24th district
- In office January 12, 1959 – November 29, 1977
- Preceded by: Dr. James L. McFadden
- Succeeded by: Donald G. Olson

Personal details
- Born: June 6, 1925 Joyce, Washington, U.S.
- Died: January 27, 2008 (aged 82) Sequim, Washington, U.S.
- Party: Democratic
- Spouse: Thelma Conner
- Children: Edward Conner, Paula Conner, Karen Conner, Kevin Conner
- Occupation: Longshoreman, Local 27

Paul H. Conner (June 6, 1925 – January 27, 2008) was an American politician who served as a member of the Washington State Senate, representing the 24th district from 1957 to 1959 and again from 1977 to 1993. A member of the Democratic Party, he previously served as a member of the Washington House of Representatives from 1959 to 1977.
