= Olympic Peninsula =

Peninsula in Washington, United States

- Satellite image of the Olympic Peninsula
- Interactive map of Olympic Peninsula

Geography
- Location: Western Washington
- Coordinates: 47°47′54″N 123°37′05″W
- Adjacent to: Pacific Ocean; Strait of Juan de Fuca; Hood Canal
- Area: 3,600 sq mi (9,300 km^{2})
- Highest elevation: 7,980 ft (2432 m)
- Highest point: Mount Olympus

Administration
- United States
- States: Washington

Demographics
- Population: 251,494 (Note: Combined population of Clallam, Jefferson, Grays Harbor, and Mason counties.) (2020)

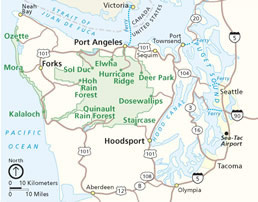
The Olympic Peninsula and Olympic National Park

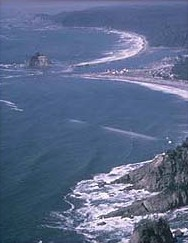
Olympic Coast National Marine Sanctuary

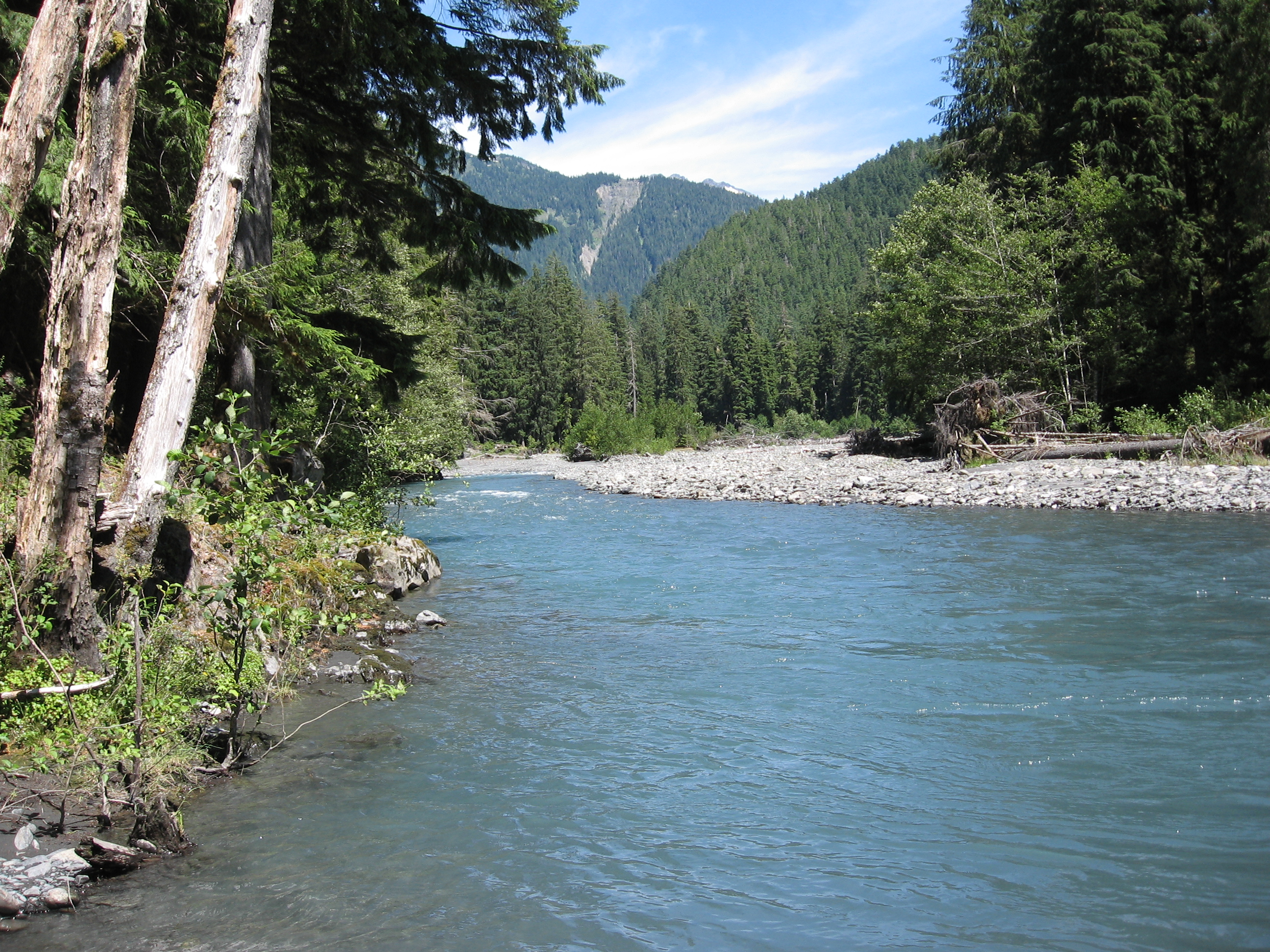
Queets River

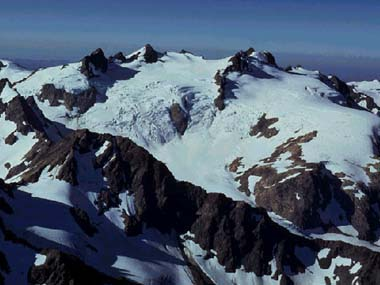
Mount Olympus

The Olympic Peninsula is a large peninsula in Western Washington that lies across Puget Sound from Seattle, and contains Olympic National Park. It is bounded on the west by the Pacific Ocean, the north by the Strait of Juan de Fuca, and the east by Hood Canal. Cape Alava, the westernmost point in the contiguous United States, and Cape Flattery, the northwesternmost point, are on the peninsula. Comprising about 3,600 square miles (9,300 km^{2}), the Olympic Peninsula contained many of the last unexplored places in the contiguous United States. It remained largely unmapped until Arthur Dodwell and Theodore Rixon mapped most of its topography and timber resources between 1898 and 1900.

== Geography ==
Clallam and Jefferson Counties, as well as the northern parts of Grays Harbor and Mason Counties, are on the peninsula. The Kitsap Peninsula, bounded by the Hood Canal and Puget Sound, is an entirely separate peninsula and is not connected to the Olympic Peninsula.

From Olympia, the state capital, U.S. Route 101 runs along the Olympic Peninsula's eastern, northern, and western shorelines.

The Olympic mountain range sits in the center of the Olympic Peninsula. This range is the second largest in Washington State. Its highest peak is Mt. Olympus.

A major effort called the Wild Olympics campaign is under way to protect additional wilderness areas on the Olympic Peninsula, protect salmon streams under the Wild and Scenic River Act and provide a means for Olympic National Park to offer to buy land adjacent to the Park from willing sellers.

=== Climate ===
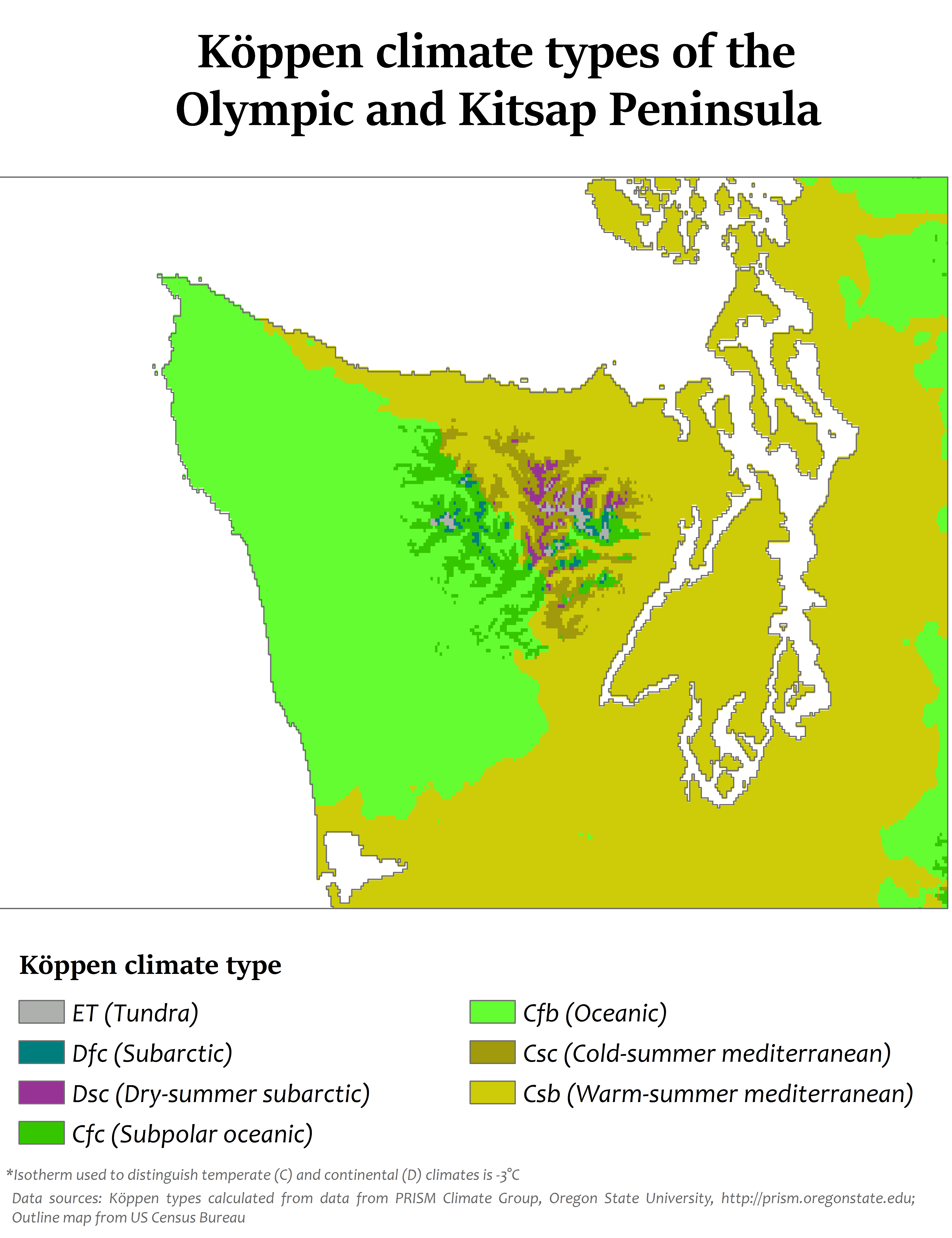
Köppen climate types of the Olympic Peninsula

Most of the peninsula has an oceanic climate, or Cfb under the Köppen climate classification. Most populated areas, however, have a warm-summer Mediterranean climate, or Csb.

The Olympic Peninsula is home to temperate rain forests, including the Hoh, Queets Rain Forest, and Quinault. Rain forest vegetation is concentrated primarily in the western part of the peninsula, as the interior mountains create a rain shadow effect in areas to the northeast, resulting in a much drier climate in those locales.

=== Rivers ===
Major salmon-bearing rivers on the Olympic Peninsula include, clockwise from the southwest, the Humptulips, the Quinault, the Queets, the Quillayute, Bogachiel, the Sol Duc, the Lyre, the Elwha (see Elwha Ecosystem Restoration), the Dungeness, the Dosewallips, the Hamma Hamma, the Skokomish, and the Wynoochee River.

=== Lakes ===
Natural lakes on the peninsula include Lake Crescent, Lake Ozette, Lake Sutherland, Lake Quinault, and Lake Pleasant. Two dammed rivers form the reservoirs of Lake Cushman and Wynoochee Lake; two previous reservoirs, destroyed in the Elwha Ecosystem Restoration were Lake Aldwell (behind the former Elwha Dam) and Lake Mills (behind the former Glines Canyon Dam).

=== Parks ===
The peninsula contains many state and national parks, including Anderson Lake, Bogachiel, Dosewallips, Fort Flagler, Fort Worden, Lake Cushman, Mystery Bay, Old Fort Townsend, Potlatch, Sequim Bay, Shine Tidelands, and Triton Cove state parks; Olympic National Park; and the Olympic National Forest. Within the Olympic National Forest, there are five designated wilderness areas: The Brothers, Buckhorn, Colonel Bob, Mt. Skokomish, and Wonder Mountain. Just off the west coast is the Washington Islands Wilderness.

== Politics ==
The Olympic Peninsula is represented in the U.S. House of Representatives by Democrat Emily Randall. It is represented in the Washington State Legislature by Democratic state senator Kevin Van De Wege and Democratic state representatives Mike Chapman and Steve Tharinger.

== Gallery ==
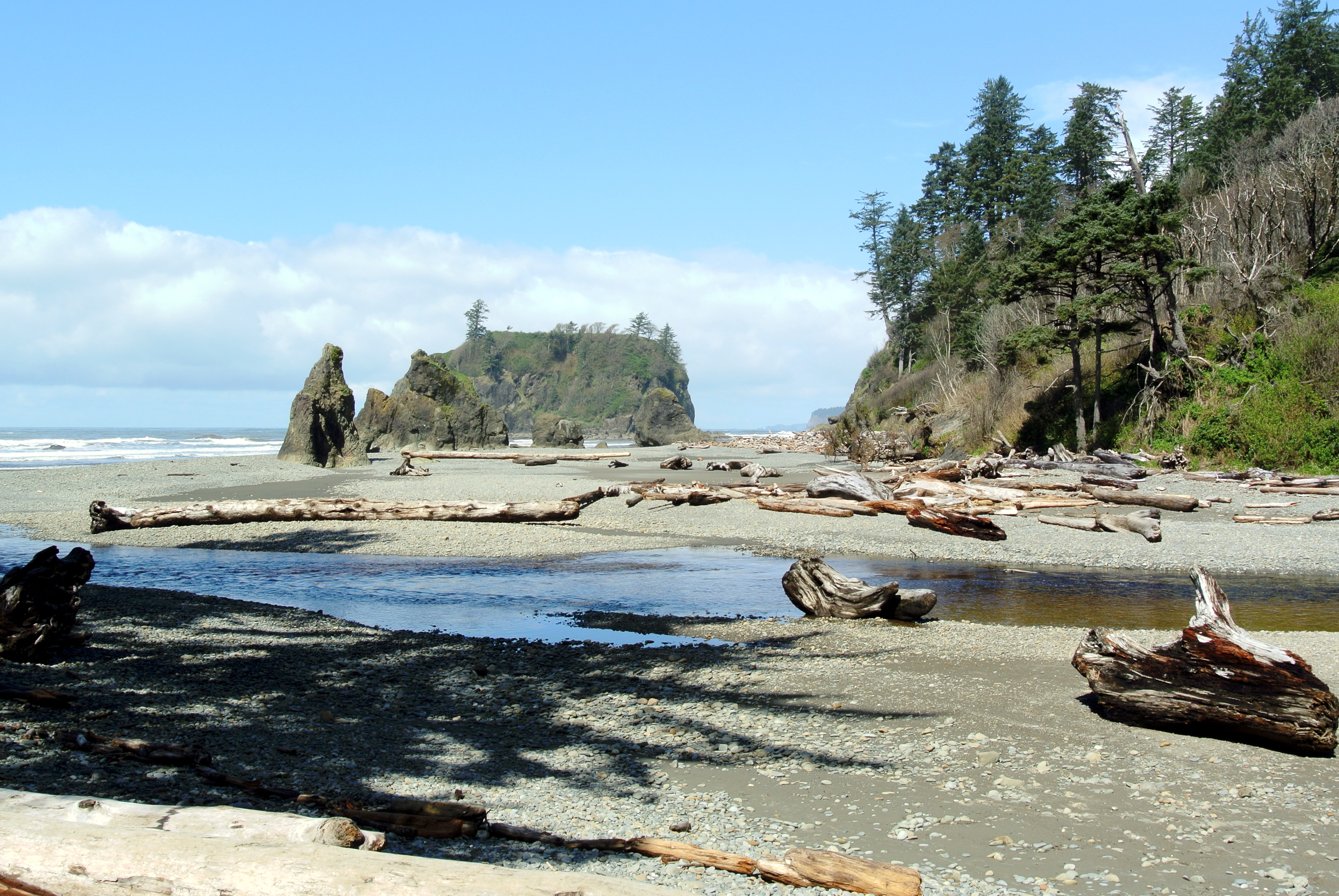
Cedar Creek and Abbey Island, Kalaloch Area

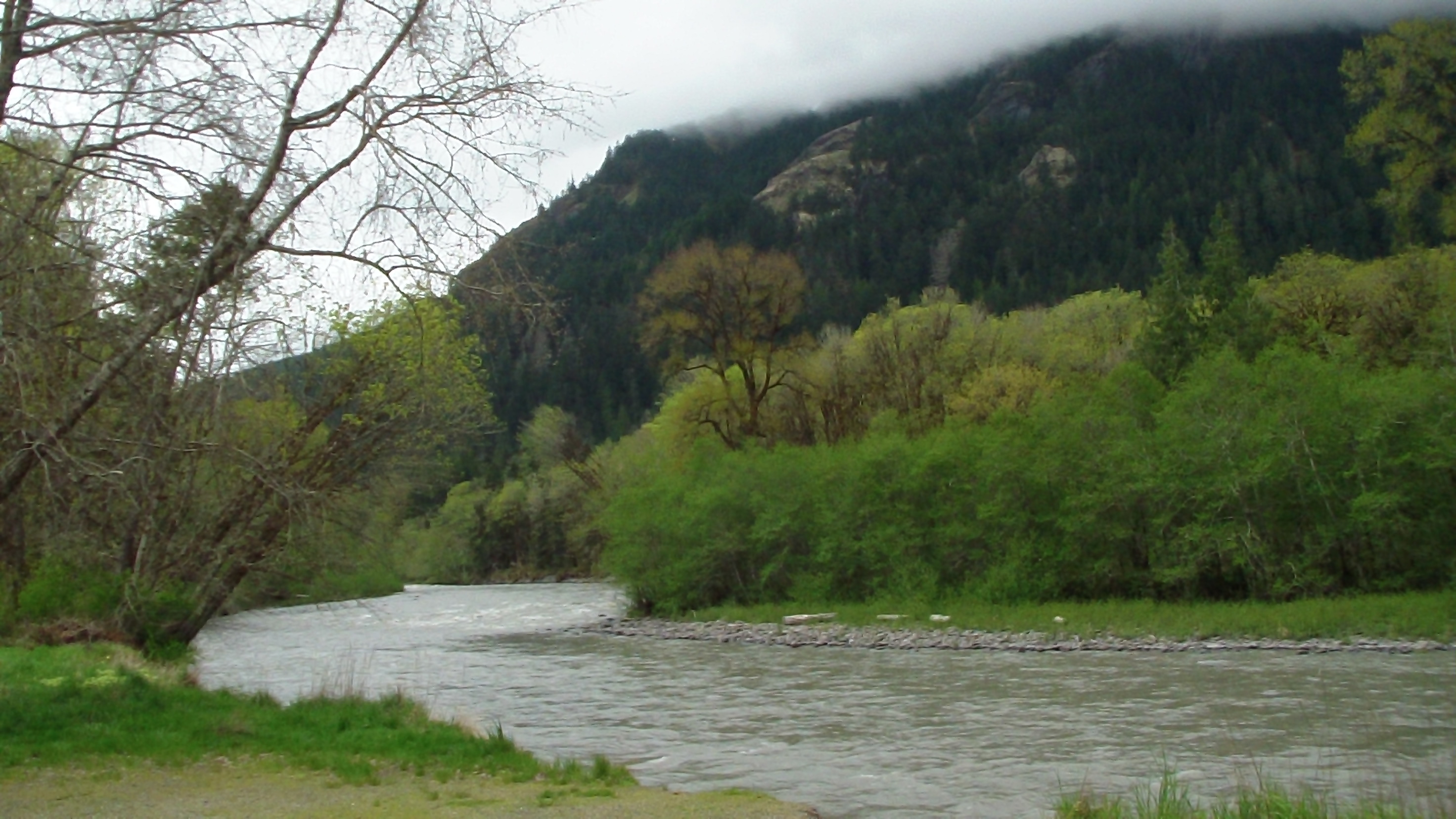
Hoh River

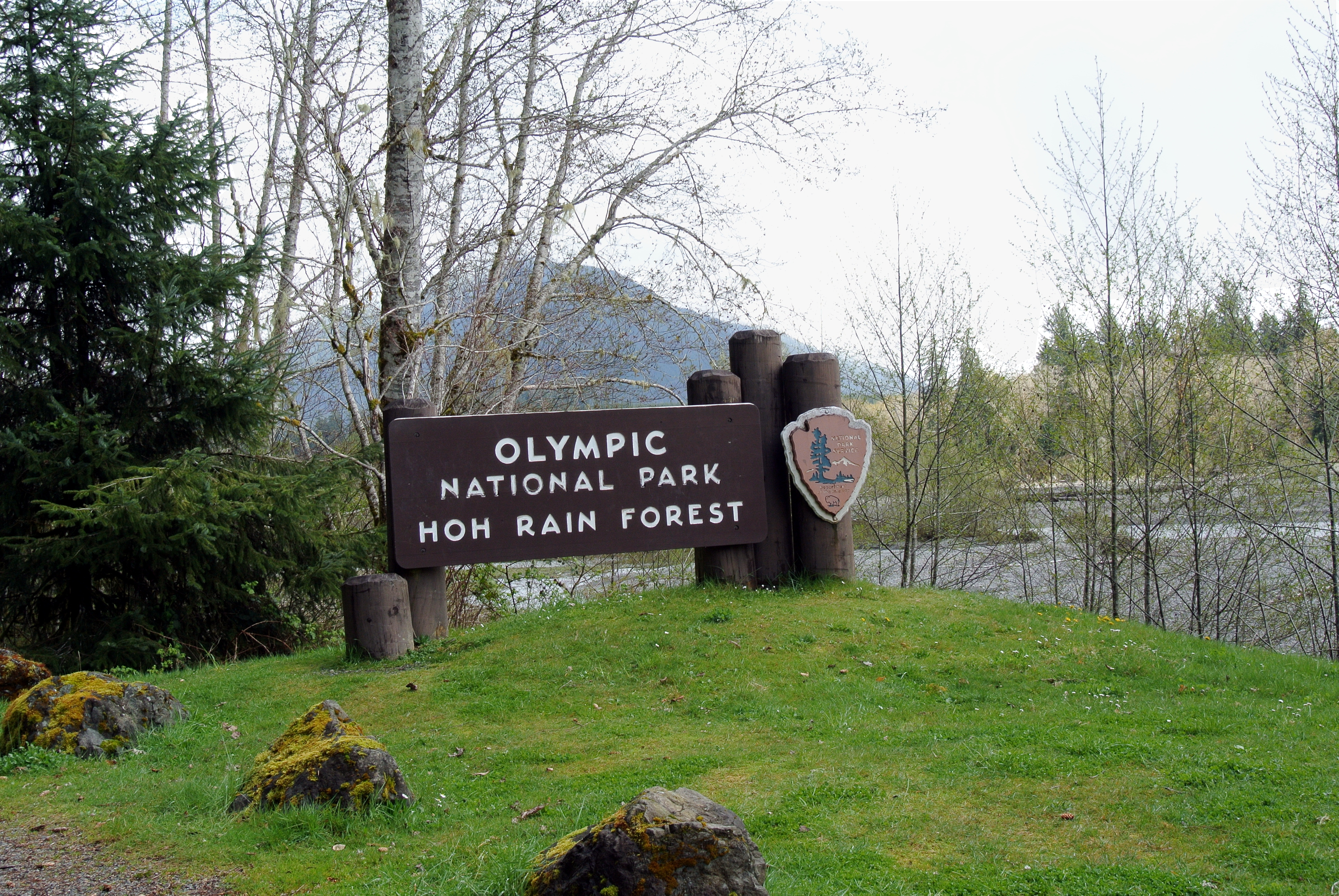
National Park Service Sign at the entrance of Hoh Rain Forest

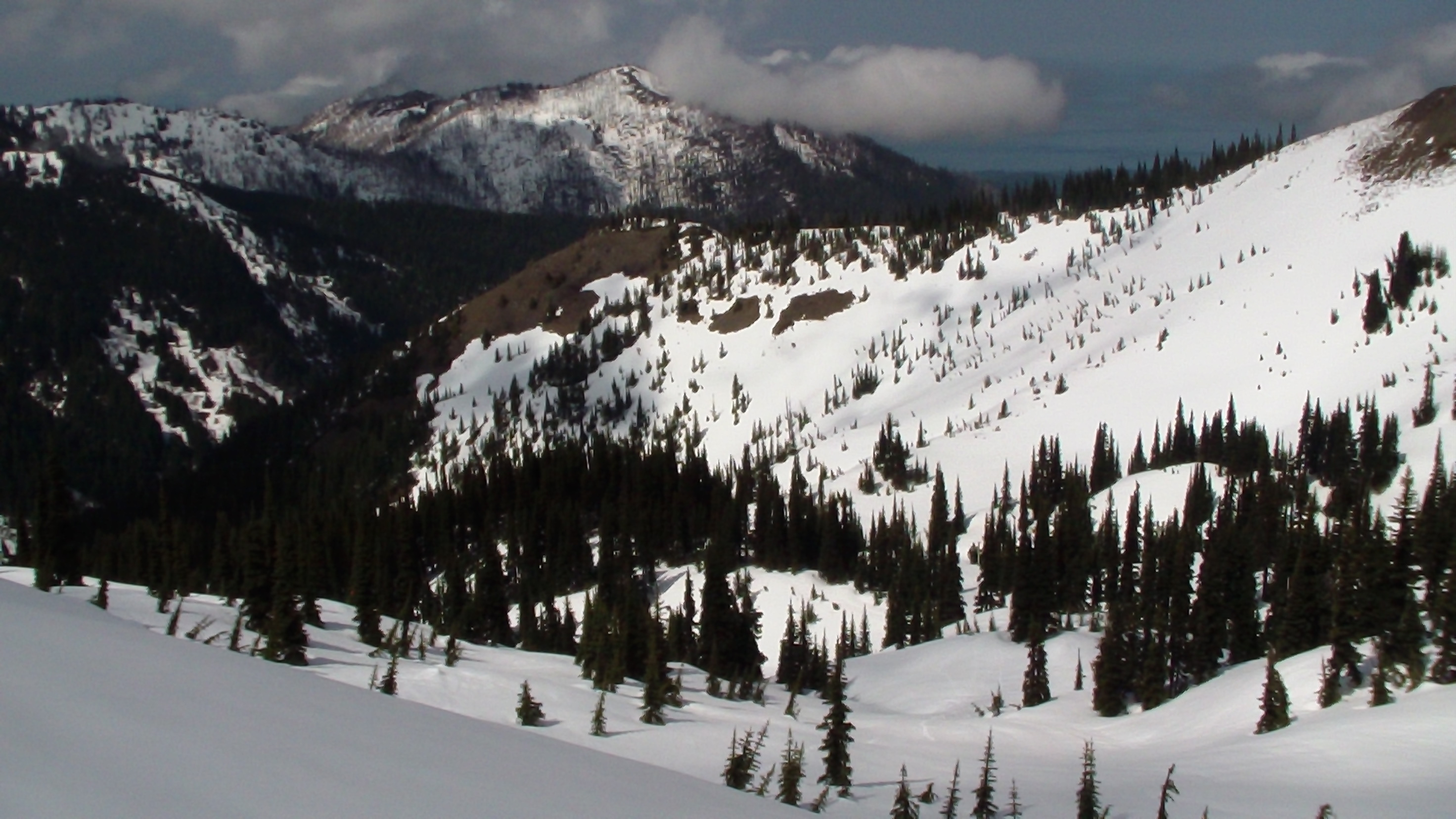
Hurricane Ridge

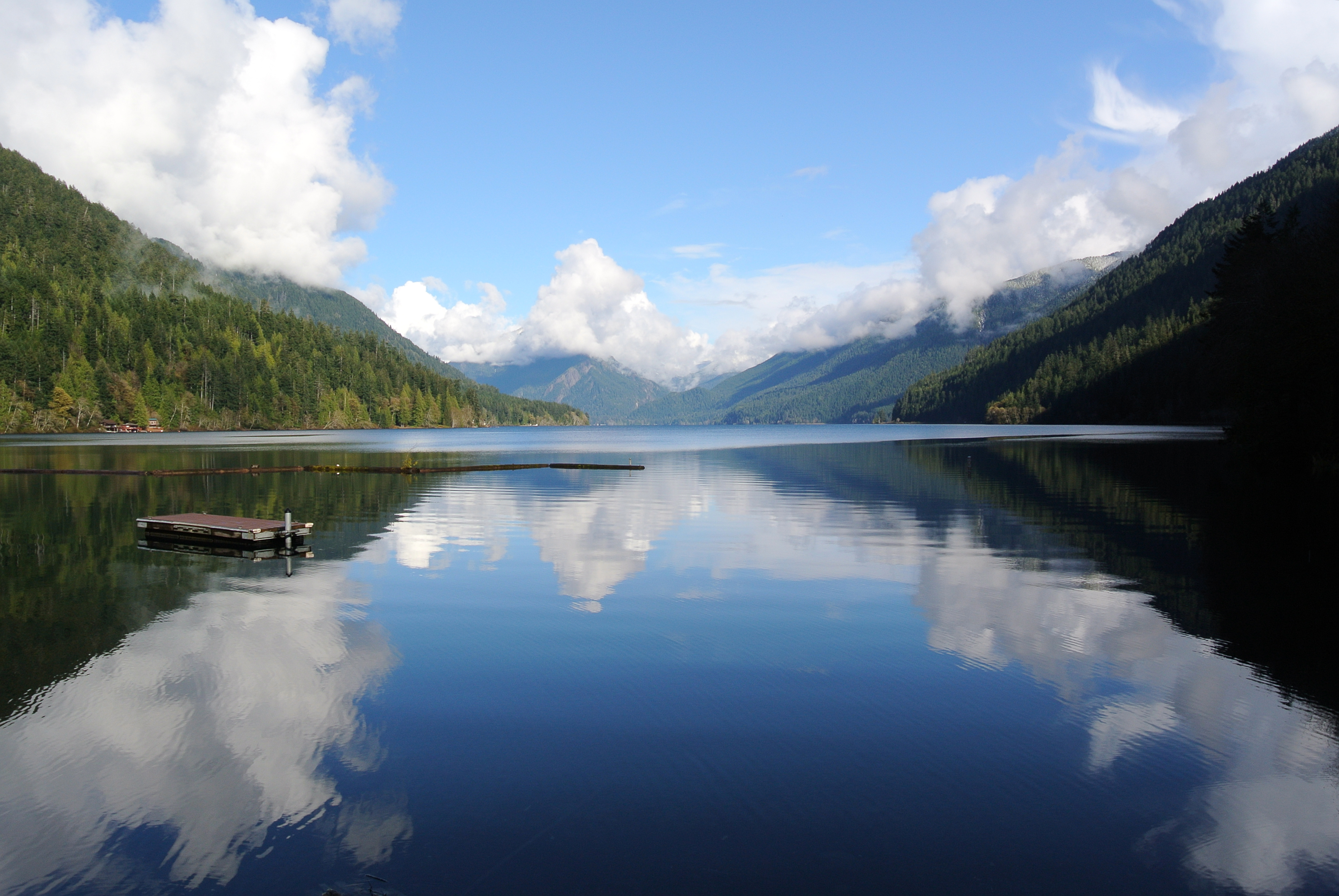
Lake Crescent

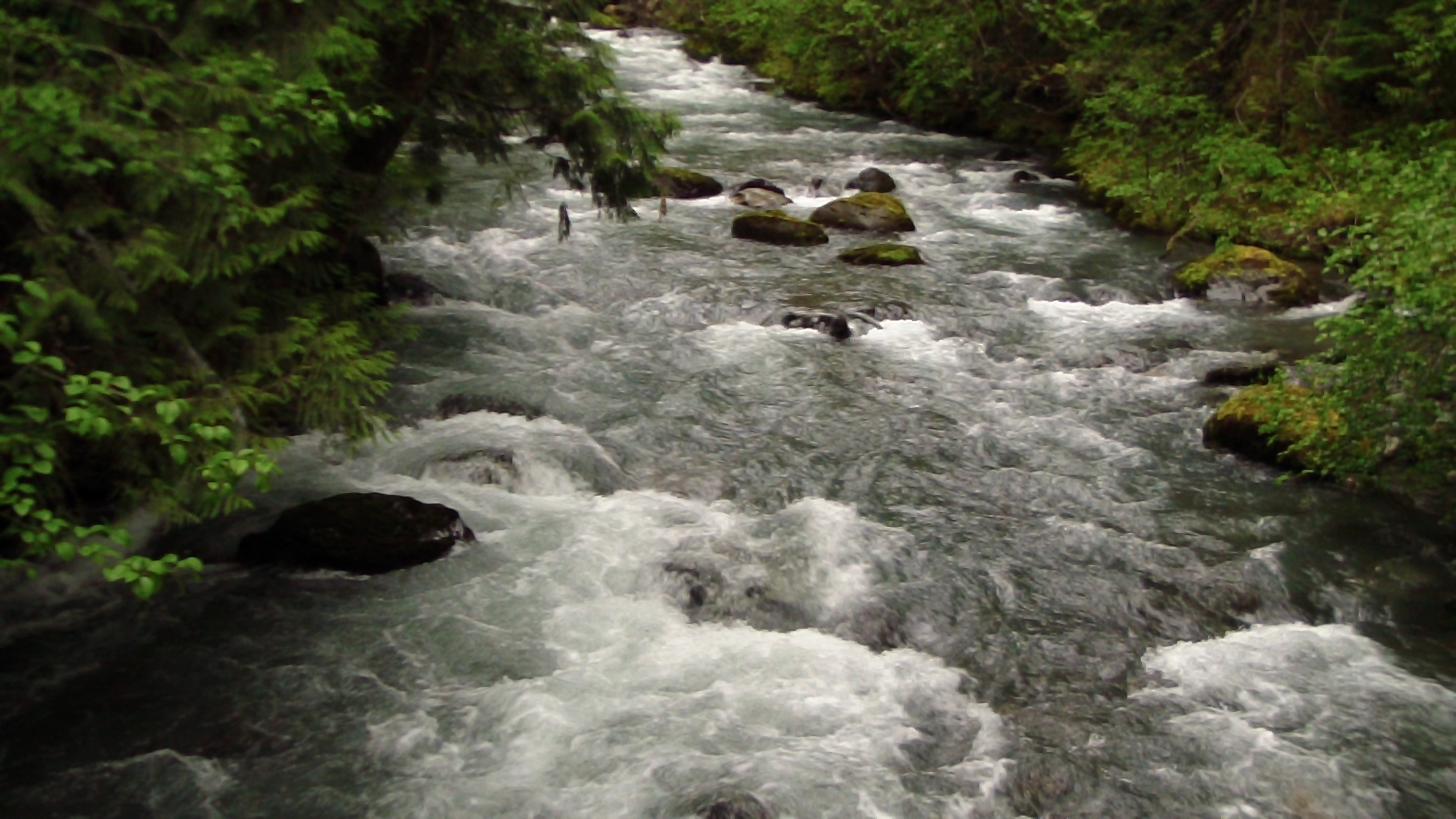
Elwha River

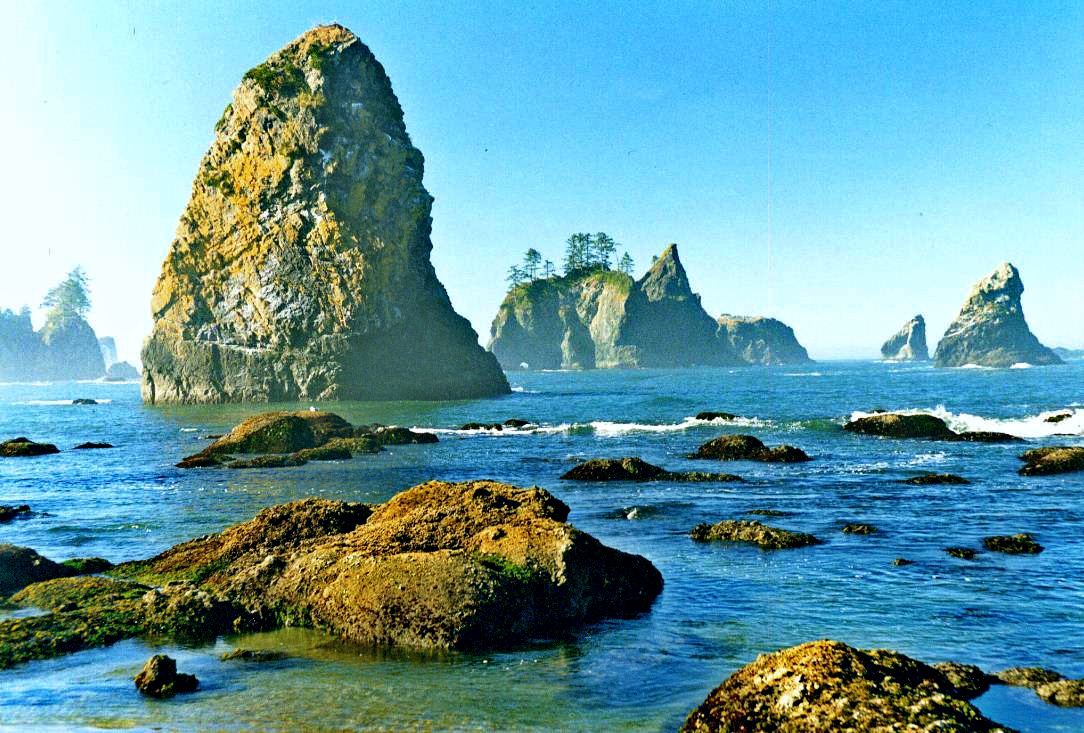
Point of the Arches

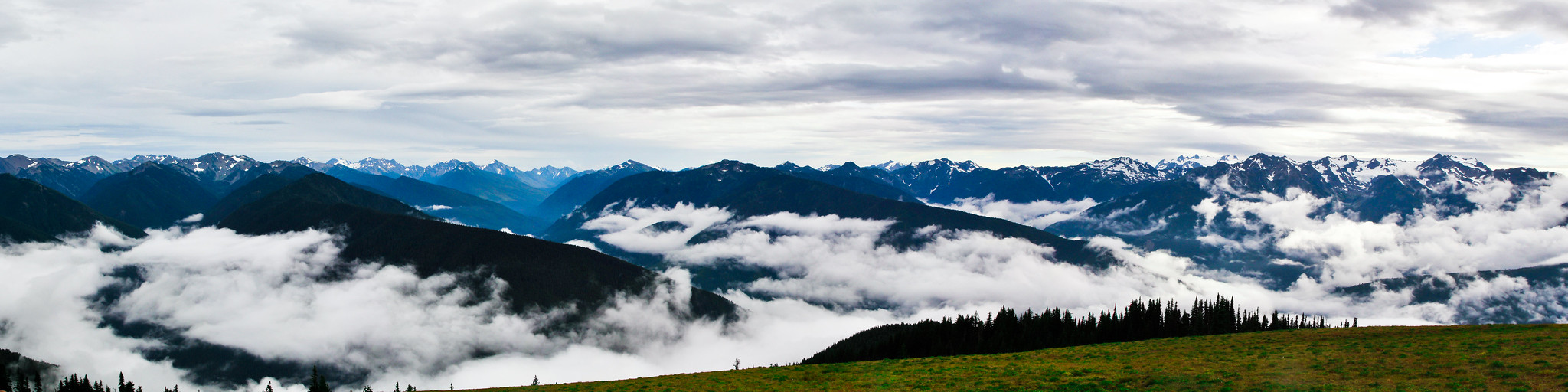
A foggy day at Hurricane Ridge

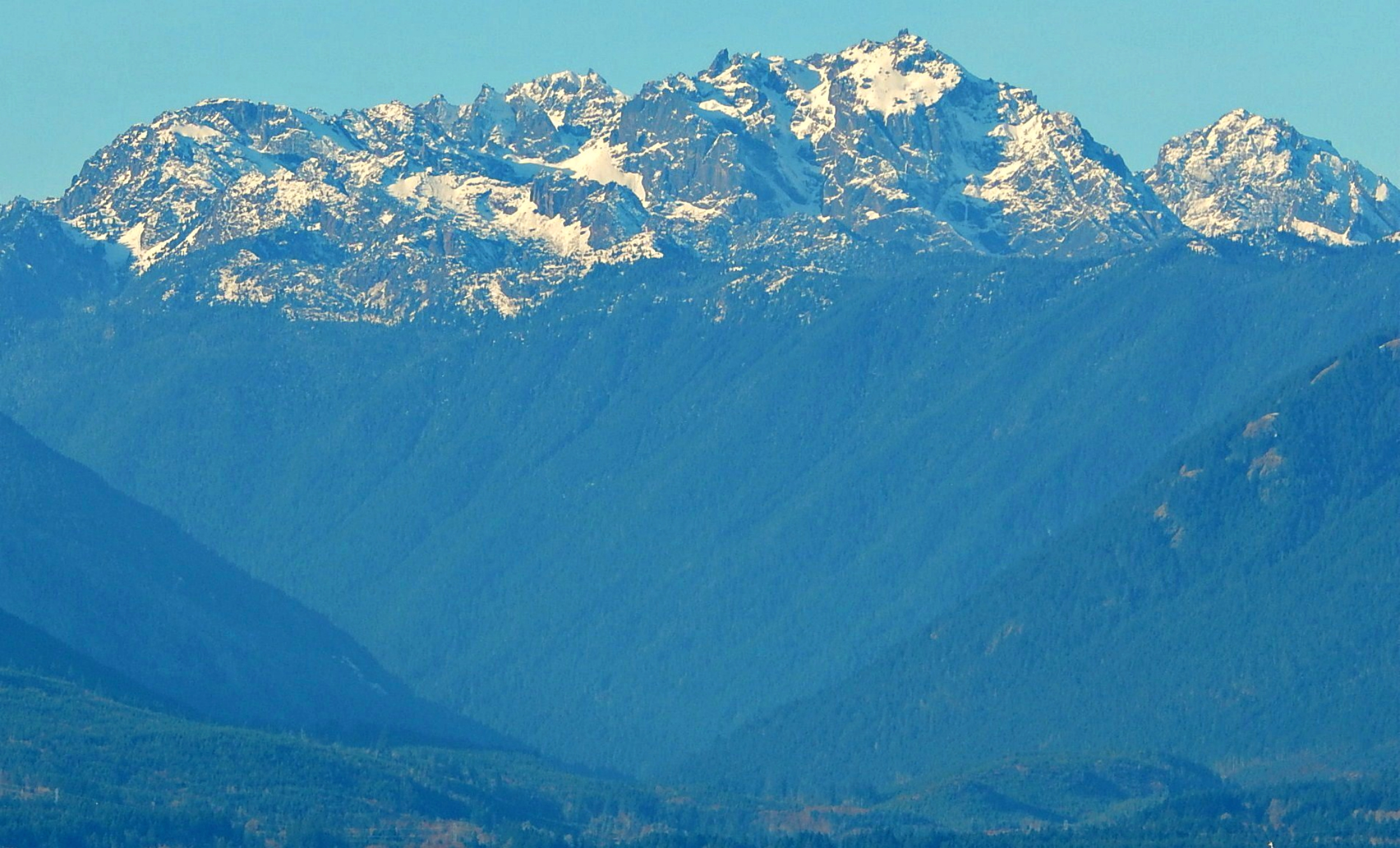
Mount Constance

== Cities and towns in the Olympic Peninsula ==
=== Population of at least 10,000 ===
- Port Angeles
- Aberdeen
- Shelton
- Port Townsend

=== Population of at least 5,000 ===
- Hoquiam
- Ocean Shores
- Sequim

=== Population of at least 1,000 ===
- Forks
- Port Hadlock
- Port Ludlow

=== Population of less than 1,000 ===
- Amanda Park
- Brinnon
- Chimacum
- Clallam Bay
- Discovery Bay
- Eldon
- Hoodsport
- Humptulips
- Kalaloch
- La Push
- Lilliwaup
- Moclips
- Mohrweis
- Neah Bay
- Ocean City
- Ozette
- Pacific Beach
- Potlatch
- Queets
- Quilcene
- Quinault
- Sekiu
- Taholah
- Union
