= Jefferson Peak =

Mountain in Washington (state), United States

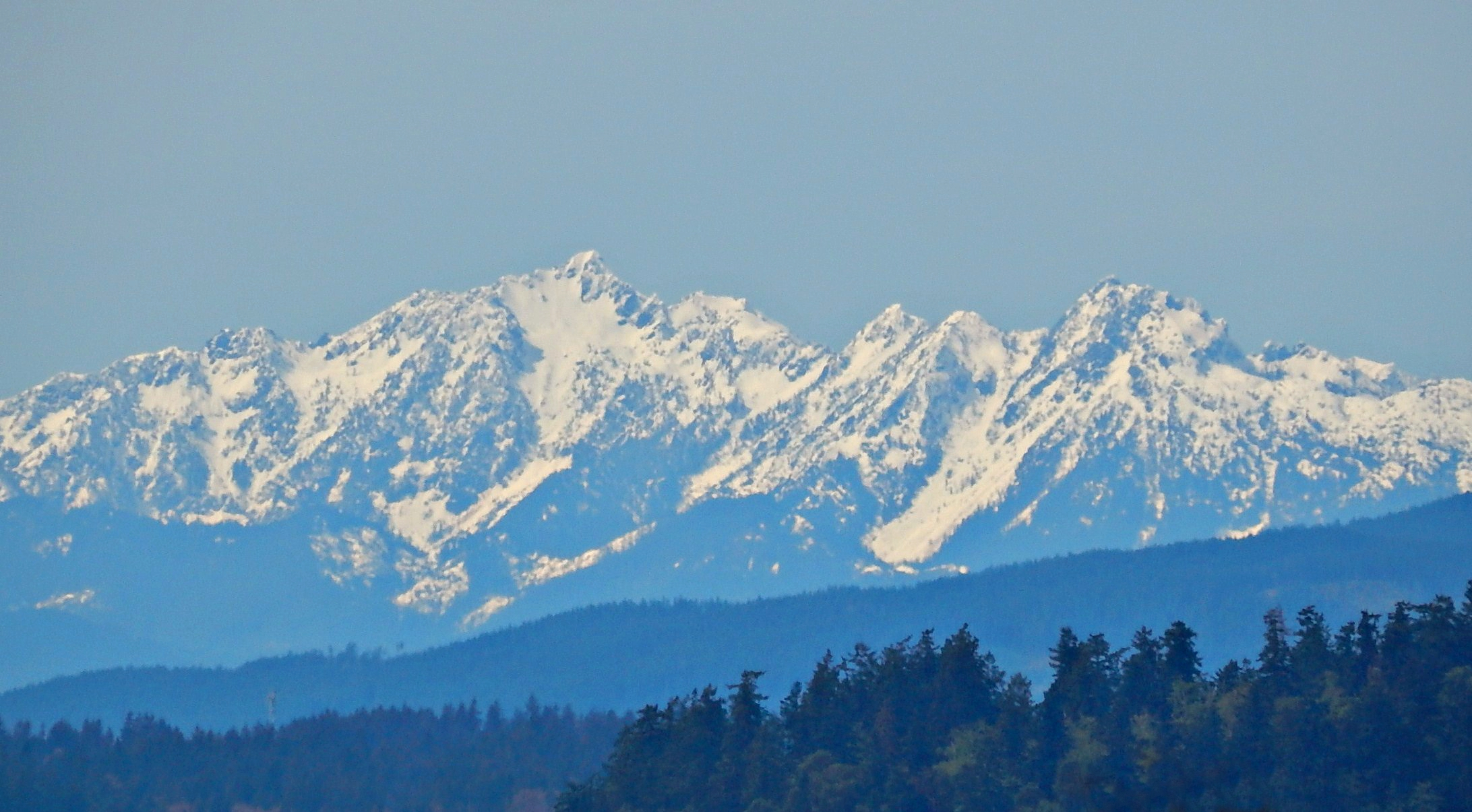
- Mt. Pershing (left) and Jefferson Peak (right) seen from West Seattle

Highest point
- Elevation: 5,720 ft (1,743 m)
- Prominence: 600 ft (183 m)
- Parent peak: Mount Pershing (6,154 ft)
- Isolation: 1.30 mi (2.09 km)
- Coordinates: 47°33′41″N 123°13′55″W

Naming
- Etymology: Thomas Jefferson

Geography
- Location within Washington (state) Location within the United States
- Country: United States
- State: Washington
- County: Mason
- Protected area: Mount Skokomish Wilderness
- Parent range: Olympic Mountains
- Topo map: USGS Mount Washington

Geology
- Rock age: Eocene
- Rock type: pillow basalt

Climbing
- First ascent: 1958
- Easiest route: class 3 scramble via Goober Pond

Jefferson Peak is a 5,720-foot (1,743 m) mountain summit located in the Olympic Mountains in Mason County of Washington state. It is situated in the Mount Skokomish Wilderness, on land managed by Olympic National Forest. The mountain's toponym honors Thomas Jefferson (1743–1826), the third president of the United States. The nearest higher neighbor is line parent Mount Pershing, 1.3 mi (2.1 km) to the southwest. Precipitation runoff drains into Jefferson Creek and the Hamma Hamma River. Topographic relief is significant as the north aspect rises over 4,100 feet (1,200 m) above the Hamma Hamma valley in approximately one mile.

== Climbing ==
The first ascent of the summit was made in 1958 by Don Anderson, Bob Oram, Keith Spencer, and Robert Petersen. There are three established scrambling routes to the summit: from Goober Pond, the North Couloir, and via the East Peak. Jefferson Peak has a 250-foot-high (class 5.3) subpeak called "Tran Spire" (4,943 feet (1,507 m)) which was first climbed in 1958 by Don Anderson and Robert Petersen .

== Climate ==
Jefferson Peak is located in the marine west coast climate zone of western North America. Weather fronts originating in the Pacific Ocean travel northeast toward the Olympic Mountains. As fronts approach, they are forced upward by the peaks (orographic lift), causing them to drop their moisture in the form of rain or snow. As a result, the Olympics experience high precipitation, especially during the winter months in the form of snowfall. Because of maritime influence, snow tends to be wet and heavy, resulting in avalanche danger. During winter months weather is usually cloudy, but due to high pressure systems over the Pacific Ocean that intensify during summer months, there is often little or no cloud cover during the summer. The months April through August offer the most favorable weather for viewing or climbing this mountain.

== Geology ==
The Olympic Mountains are composed of obducted clastic wedge material and oceanic crust, primarily Eocene sandstone, turbidite, and basaltic oceanic crust. The mountains were sculpted during the Pleistocene era by erosion and glaciers advancing and retreating multiple times.

== Gallery ==
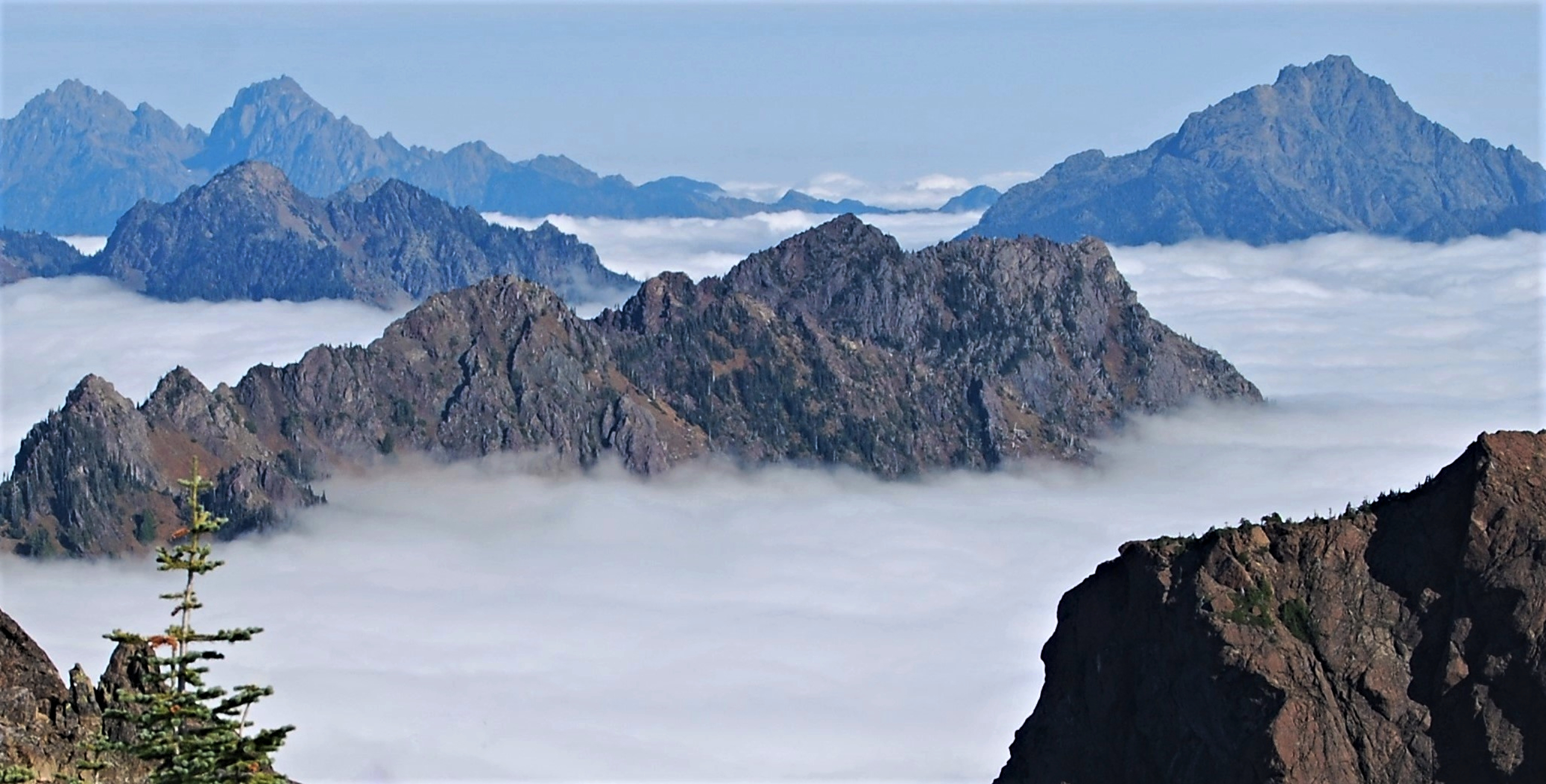
Jefferson Peak centered.
(Mount Bretherton and Mount Constance to left, The Brothers to right)

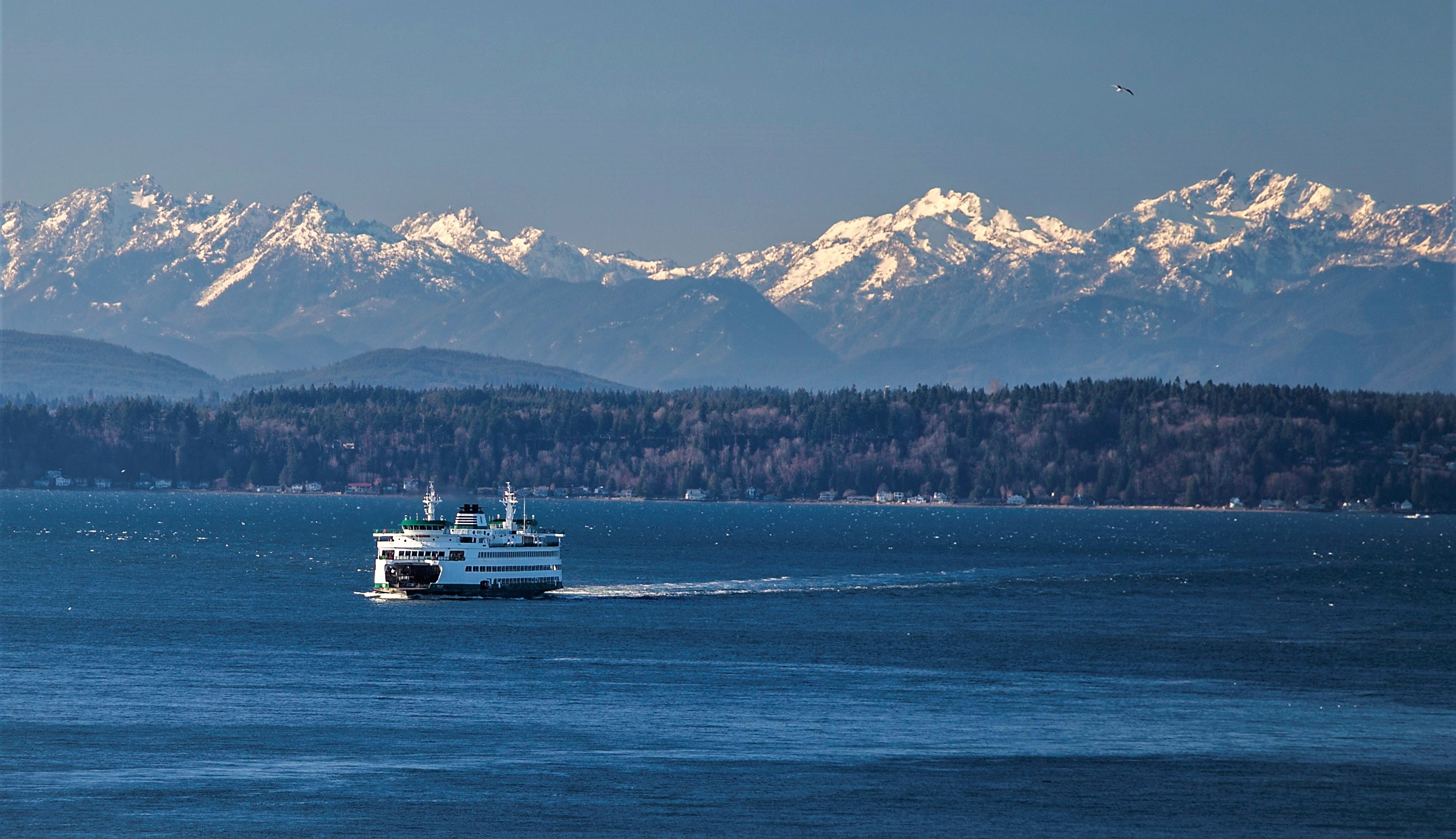
Ferry on Puget Sound. Left to right: Mt. Pershing, Jefferson Peak, Mt. Cruiser, Mt. Skokomish, Mt. Stone

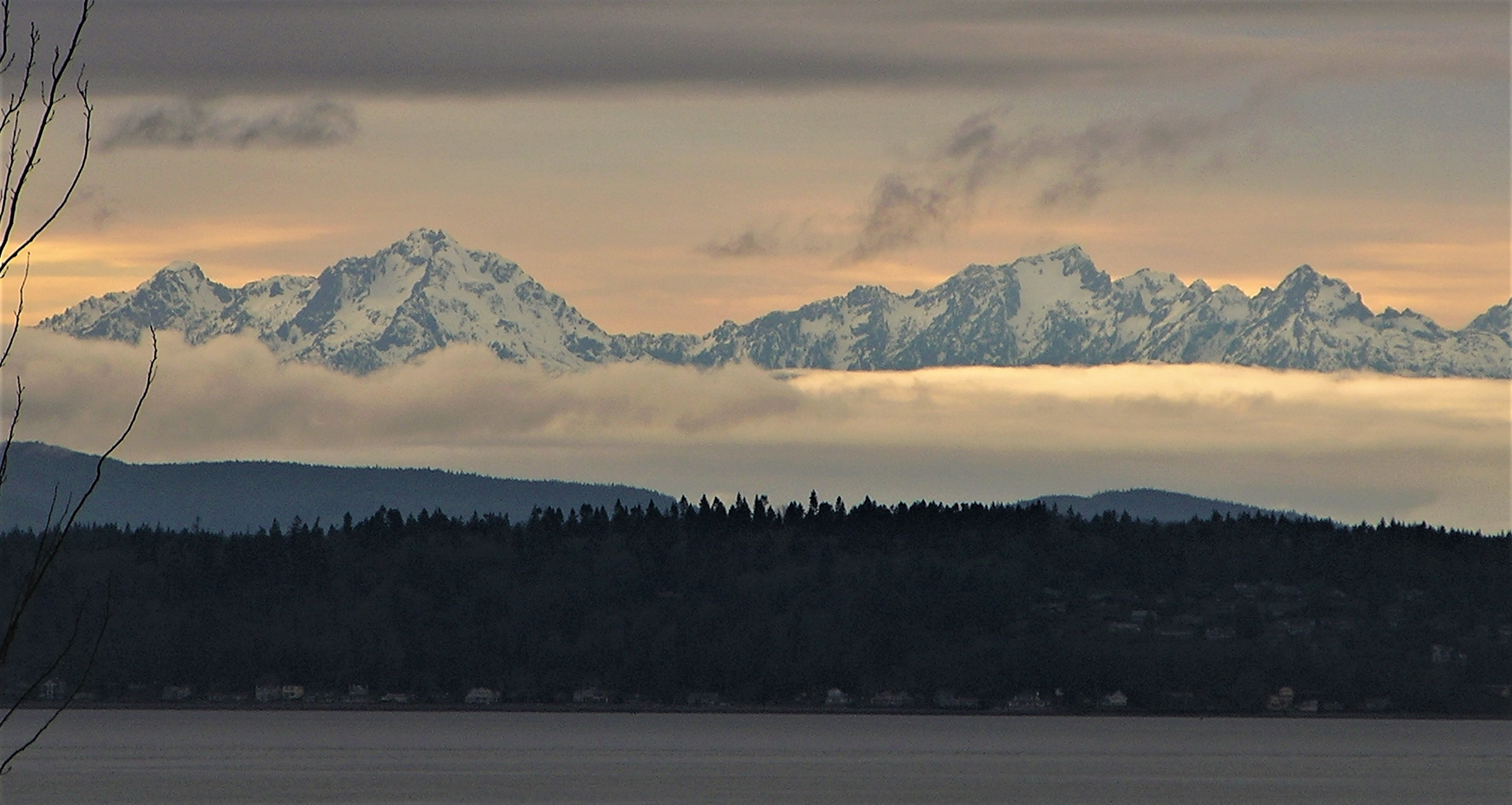
Left to rightː Mt. Ellinor, Mt. Washington, Mt. Pershing, Jefferson Peak.
View from Seattle.

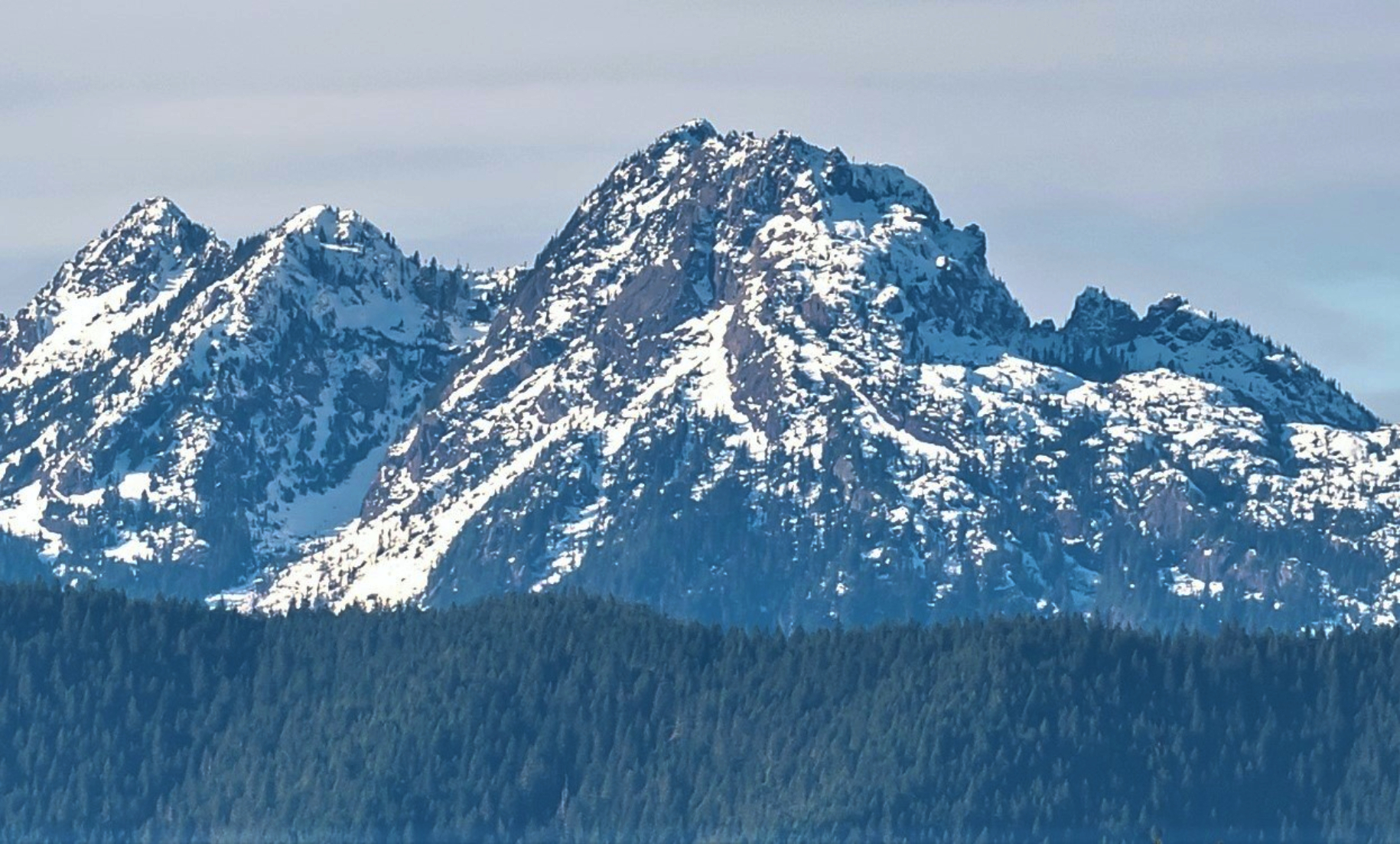
Jefferson Peak

== See also ==
- Olympic Mountains
- Geology of the Pacific Northwest
