= James Buck =

James Buck may refer to:

- James Buck (Medal of Honor) (c. 1808–1865), United States Navy sailor and Medal of Honor recipient
- Jim Buck (Indiana politician) (born 1945), member of the Indiana State Senate
- Jim Buck (Washington politician) (born 1948), member of the Washington House of Representatives
- Jim Buck (dog walker) (1931–2013), New York City dog walker

== See also ==
- James Jordan Buck, the 2nd highest scoring typical white-tailed deer harvested in the United States
