= Gordon Sandison =

Gordon Sandison may refer to:

- Gordon Sandison (politician)
- Gordon Sandison (baritone)
- Gordon Sandison (trade unionist)
