= Gordon Sandison (politician) =

American politician

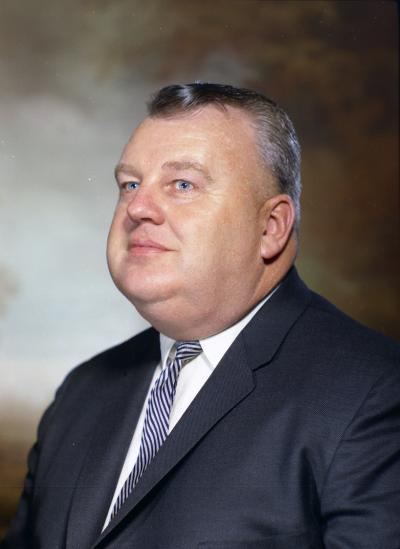
- Sandison in 1967

Member of the Washington Senate from the 24th district
- In office January 12, 1959 – June 21, 1977
- Preceded by: Paul Conner
- Succeeded by: Donald G. Olson

Member of the Washington House of Representatives from the 24th district
- In office October 9, 1947 – January 12, 1959
- Preceded by: Francis Pearson
- Succeeded by: Dr. James L. McFadden

Personal details
- Born: February 20, 1919 Auburn, Washington, U.S.
- Died: October 27, 1989 (aged 70) Port Angeles, Washington, U.S.
- Party: Democratic

Gordon T. Sandison (February 20, 1919 – October 27, 1989) was an American politician in the state of Washington. He served in the Washington House of Representatives from 1949 to 1959 for district 24, and in the Senate from 1958 to 1977, when he was appointed as director of the Washington Department of Fisheries.
