= Jim Buck (Washington politician) =

American politician and engineer from Washington

Member of the Washington House of Representatives from the 24th district
- In office January 9, 1995 – January 8, 2007
- Preceded by: Evan Jones
- Succeeded by: Kevin Van De Wege

Personal details
- Born: October 31, 1948 (age 77) Mount Holly, New Jersey, U.S.
- Party: Republican
- Spouse: Donna Buck
- Children: 2
- Education: United States Military Academy (BA)
- Occupation: Engineer, politician

James Buck (born October 31, 1948) is an American politician and engineer from Washington. Buck is a former Republican Party member of the Washington House of Representatives, representing the 24th district from 1995 to 2007. In 2006, Buck was defeated by Democrat Kevin Van De Wege.

== Personal life ==
Buck's wife is Donna Buck. They have two children. Buck and his family live in Joyce, Washington.
