= Mohrweis, Washington =

Unincorporated community in Washington, United States

- Unincorporated community
- Location in Washington and the United States Mohrweis (the United States)
- Coordinates: 47°19′19″N 123°14′9″W
- Country: United States
- State: Washington
- County: Mason
- Time zone: UTC-8 (Pacific (PST))
  - Summer (DST): UTC-7 (PDT)

Mohrweis is an unincorporated community in Mason County, Washington, United States. It is located within the Skokomish Valley south of the Olympic National Forest.

== History ==
A post office called Mohrweis was established in 1907 and remained in operation until 1918.
