= Mount Zion (Washington) =

Mountain in Washington (state), United States

- Location within Washington (state)

Highest point
- Elevation: 4,278 ft (1,304 m) NGVD 29
- Prominence: 1,318 ft (402 m)
- Coordinates: 47°55′24″N 123°00′38″W

Geography
- Location: Clallam County, Washington, U.S.
- Parent range: Olympic Mountains
- Topo map: USGS Mount Zion

Climbing
- Easiest route: Trail hike

Mount Zion is a 4,278-foot (1,304 m) peak in the Olympic National Forest. The peak is located 9.5 miles (15.3 km) northwest of Quilcene, and near Lords Lake and Bon Jon Pass. Billed as one of the easier hikes in the Olympics, Zion offers a 1,340-foot (410 m) elevation gain in just under 2 miles (3.2 km).

== Trail Characteristics ==
For those testing its trail in June and July, rhododendrons in full bloom crowd the sides of the path. The trail ascends through remnants of long-ago fires, second growth fir and cedar, spring blooming rhododendrons, Oregon grape, salal and leafy ferns. Near the top of the trail, basalt monoliths rise from the wooded slopes. One of the tallest offers westward views of Gray Wolf Ridge.

Views of the Olympic Mountains are screened by trees, but glimpses of Mount Baker and Mount Shuksan are there for the taking to the northeast and Mount Rainier can be seen to the southeast.
