= Kevin Van De Wege =

American firefighter and politician from Washington

Member of the Washington Senate from the 24th district
- In office January 9, 2017 – October 2, 2024
- Preceded by: Jim Hargrove
- Succeeded by: Mike Chapman

Member of the Washington House of Representatives from the 24th district
- In office January 8, 2007 – January 9, 2017
- Preceded by: Jim Buck
- Succeeded by: Mike Chapman

Personal details
- Born: Kevin Wayne Van De Wege; October 2, 1974 (age 52) Seattle, Washington, U.S.
- Party: Democratic
- Spouse: Jennifer Van De Wege
- Education: Edmonds Community College (AAS); Washington State University (BA); Fort Hays State University (MPA)
- Profession: Firefighter

Kevin Wayne Van De Wege (born October 2, 1974) is an American firefighter and former politician who served as a member of the Washington State Senate, representing the 24th district from 2017 until his resignation on October 2, 2024. A member of the Democratic Party, he previously served as a member of the Washington House of Representatives from 2007 to 2017. His district included much of the Olympic Peninsula, which is made up of Clallam County, Jefferson County, and half of Grays Harbor County, and includes Forks, Hoquiam, Port Angeles, Port Townsend, Sequim, McCleary, Elma, and Ocean Shores.

Van De Wege chaired the Senate Agriculture, Water, Natural Resources & Parks Committee and also served on the Senate Ways & Means Committee and the Senate Health & Long Term Care Committee. He lived in Sequim Washington for 20 years before moving to Port Angeles with his wife Jennifer, a Principal at Tenino Elementary School. His daughter, Allison, is a graduate from Western Washington University and is working in child development and education with the YMCA. His son, Jackson, is studying at Montana State University.

== Early life and education ==
Van De Wege was born in Seattle in 1974 and grew up in rural Whatcom County. As a child, he worked on berry farms and at a local dairy farm. He attended Meridian School District public schools from kindergarten through high school. During his senior year of high school he joined Whatcom County Fire District #3 as a volunteer. This experience sparked a lifelong interest in public safety and the fire service.

After graduating from high school in 1993, Van De Wege attended Edmonds Community College where he earned an associate's degree in fire investigation in 1995 and an associate degree in fire command and administration in 1996. In 2002, Van De Wege received a Bachelor of Arts in social science from Washington State University, and a Master of Arts in Public Administration from Fort Hays State University.

== Career as firefighter ==
Starting in 1995 Van De Wege served as a Resident Firefighter with Snohomish County Fire District #7 and completed paramedic training. During the summer of 1998 he did a paramedic internship in Baton Rouge, Louisiana and became a fully certified paramedic later that fall.

Van De Wege was hired in February 1999 to his first paid position as a firefighter/paramedic with the Sunnyside Fire Department. He worked there for two years until he was offered a full-time position in Sequim in 2001. As of 2024, Van De Wege serves as a Captain with the Clallam County Fire District #3.

== State Representative ==
In 2004, Van De Wege challenged Republican incumbent Representative Jim Buck, narrowly losing 51-49 percent, a margin of fewer than 2,000 votes.

In 2006, Van De Wege again challenged Buck, and this time won the election by more than 3,000 votes 53-47 percent. In his first term in the House, Van De Wege was selected by his colleagues to serve as an assistant majority whip. He was also selected to a key committee focusing on veteran's issues.

In 2008, Thomas Thomas of Joyce challenged Van De Wege. Van De Wege prevailed with more than 65 percent of the vote. Van De Wege has become a strong advocate for the timber and biomass industries on the Olympic Peninsula. Rep. Van De Wege also led the fight to secure permanent funding for the Neah Bay rescue tug, which provides year-round protection for marine vessels in the Straits of Juan de Fuca.

In 2010, Van De Wege won in an anti-Democratic year with nearly 56% of the vote. He was challenged by Port Angeles real estate broker and consultant Dan Gase, who refused to initially acknowledge defeat. Overall, Republicans gained control of several Democratic seats across the state, and Van De Wege's results showed his ability to win support across party lines.

In 2012, Van De Wege was challenged by Port Ludlow resident Craig Durgan. Van De Wege prevailed with 64% of the vote in the general election.

In 2014, Representative Van De Wege ran unchallenged.

== State Senate ==
In 2016, Van De Wege announced his intention to run for Washington's 24th State Senate district, being vacated by the retiring Jim Hargrove. Van De Wege went on to defeat Independent Republican Danille Turissini in the election, winning 56.6% against Turissini's 43.4%.

In 2020, Senator Van De Wege was re-elected with 54.1% of the vote against Republican Port of Port Angeles Commissioner Connie Beauvais who received 45.8% of the vote.

Van De Wege is a member of the Port Angeles Regional Chamber of Commerce, co-chairs the Heritage Caucus in Olympia, and is a member of the Law Enforcement Officer and Fire Fighter Pension Board.

Van De Wege resigned from his seat on October 2, 2024.

== 2024 Washington Public Lands Commissioner election ==
Van De Wege announced his campaign for Public Lands Commissioner on June 21, 2023, giving up his seat in the Senate. He did not make it through the primary election, finishing sixth out of seven candidates, with 7.52% of the vote.
