= Public long-term care insurance in Washington (state) =

In the U.S. State of Washington, long-term care insurance is provided to eligible residents through the WA Cares Fund. The first of its kind in the United States, Washington’s public long-term care insurance will start paying benefits to qualified residents in July 2026. Residents who qualify can use their benefits to pay for long-term care services and supports such as home caregivers, medical equipment, home safety evaluations and renovations, assistive technology, family caregivers, and long-term care facilities.

== History ==
The WA Cares Fund was signed into law by Washington Governor Jay Inslee in 2019 as the Long Term Services and Supports (LTSS) Trust Act.

In 2014, the Joint Legislative Executive Committee on Aging and Disability (ADJLEC) was established to begin research on potential state-level policy solutions to the struggles many Americans face in paying for long-term care as they age. The committee’s stated goal was finding a long-term care coverage option that would also reduce Medicaid expenditures.

In 2015, Washington’s Department of Social and Health Services (DSHS) partnered with Milliman, an actuarial firm, to conduct feasibility studies on the options identified by ADJLEC. While ADJLEC considered both private and public options for long-term care support, feasibility studies modeled two main scenarios - a public long-term care benefit, funded through payroll contributions, and a public-private partnership, a risk-sharing model that would subsidize private long-term care insurance companies in expanding coverage options and capacity in Washington state.

Milliman’s analysis was completed in 2018. The report to the Washington State Legislature determined that a public long-term care benefit for workers, funded by payroll contributions, would best achieve the state’s goals. Milliman ruled out a public-private risk-sharing model due to issues with affordability and underwriting and cited issues with adverse selection for a voluntary public option.

Based on ADJLEC’s proposed options and Milliman’s analysis, the state legislature passed the Long-Term Services and Supports Trust Act (House Bill 1087) in 2019, creating both the WA Cares Fund and the Long-Term Services and Supports (LTSS) Trust Commission. The LTSS Trust Commission is made up of legislators, heads of administering departments, and stakeholders, and was tasked with improving, monitoring, and implementing the WA Cares program.

Since the WA Cares Fund was established, it has undergone a number of legislated changes to make the fund and benefits more accessible to Washington workers. In 2021, the Washington State Legislature added coverage for adults with disabilities that began before the age of 18.

In 2022, near-retirees were granted the option of building partial benefits before retirement. In the same year, voluntary exemptions were established for out-of-state workers, workers on non-immigrant visas, military spouses, and veterans with disabilities.

In the 2024 legislative session, benefits from the WA Cares Fund were made portable, meaning those participating in the fund can keep benefits if moving out of Washington state.

== Need for public long-term care insurance ==
An estimated 70% of Americans will need long-term care at some point in their lives due to disability, chronic illness, or aging, but most do not have a way to pay for it. Medicare and private health insurance do not pay for long-term care. Taxpayer-funded Medicaid will only pay for long-term care as a last resort for Washington residents with $2,000 or less in assets, possibly requiring participants to sign over their homes to qualify.

Women bear the brunt of caring for people without long-term care coverage. Women make up two-thirds of family caregivers. Nearly one in four workers, most often women, have to leave their jobs or cut hours to care for loved ones with health conditions. 86% of caregivers are working age, or under 65. As caregivers, women are 73% more likely than men to permanently leave their jobs and five times more likely to work part-time due to caregiving demands.

Washington state is currently home to 820,000 unpaid caregivers. In 2021, Washington state caregivers - mostly women - provided $16.8 billion worth of care, or 770 million unpaid care hours. This $16.8 billion does not account for money spent on caregiving, lost wages for caregivers who cut hours or left jobs, or lifetime income loss. Unpaid family caregivers spend an average of $7,242 each year of their own money on caregiving costs, or around 26% of their income for someone else’s needs.

Only 3% to 4% of Americans 50 and older have private long-term care insurance due to costly premiums and a collapsing private market. The Kaiser Family Health Foundation reports “Today, most insurers have stopped selling stand-alone long-term care policies: The ones that still exist are too expensive for most people. And they have become less affordable each year, with insurers raising premiums higher and higher.”

Most people must pay out of pocket for long-term care costs from emergency savings, pensions, trusts, or reverse home mortgages. However, a 2024 survey revealed that 27% of Americans have no emergency savings at all. 40% reported that they would need to borrow money - from credit cards, loans, or family and friends - if faced with an unexpected expense greater than $1000. Fewer than 3 in 10 adults aged 50-64 say they have money set aside for long-term care needs.

== Eligibility ==
Workers in Washington began paying premiums into the WA Cares Fund in July 2023. All Washington residents are eligible if they work for at least 500 hours per year (or 10 hours per week) for 10 years without a break of five years or more.

Premiums amount to 0.58% of employee wages and are automatically contributed from each paycheck. A resident earning the state’s median monthly wage of $63,252 would pay $30.71 per month.

After contributing for 10 years, workers are able to access the total long-term care benefit amount whenever they need care in the future. Unlike Medicaid, there are no maximum income or asset requirements for Washington’s long-term care benefits.

== Exemptions ==
All full-time, part-time, and temporary workers in Washington contribute to the WA Cares Fund unless they have an approved exemption. Federal employees do not contribute. Employees of tribal businesses only contribute if the tribe has chosen to opt in. Self-employed workers only earn benefits if they opt-in. Other exemptions include workers whose permanent home address is outside Washington, temporary workers on a non-immigrant visa, spouses or registered domestic partners of active-duty military members, and veterans with 70% or higher service-connected disabilities. At the beginning of the program, workers could obtain an exemption with proof of private long-term care insurance coverage. That exemption period ended December 31, 2022.

== Benefits ==
In 2026, the first-year funding is available, the total benefit amount is $36,500. The lifetime benefit amount is set to adjust annually with inflation - benefit amounts in 2046 would be $59,809.50 if adjusted by 2.5% each year.

Benefits are available to Washingtonians who move out of state. Partial benefits are available to people currently near retirement at 10% of benefits for every year worked.

Once vested, workers have lifetime access to the WA Cares Fund benefit, even after they stop working. To receive benefits, people must demonstrate a care need and apply. Care needs are determined by evaluating assistance needed with activities of daily living (ADLs). To qualify, people must demonstrate a need for assistance with three or more tasks, such as mobility, hygiene, eating, medication management, or cognition.

After meeting contribution and care need requirements, people will apply via Washington DSHS. Once approved, people can use their benefit for their chosen long-term care supports, which will be paid directly from the WA Cares Fund.

According to a state workgroup, these funds could pay for about 2,281 home-delivered meals, seven years of transportation services, or $15,000 worth of adaptive equipment and technology to help with a disability. To give breaks to family caregivers, the benefit could also provide up to $45 an hour for in-home caregivers.

== Attempt to Repeal ==
In 2024, hedge fund manager Brian Heywood launched a campaign entitled Let's Go Washington to promote six initiatives including Initiative 2124, to make Washington’s long-term care insurance optional. I-2124 sponsor State GOP Chair Jim Walsh lost a lawsuit to hide I-2124's fiscal impacts from voters. The court-approved statement for the November 2024 Washington State ballot is “This measure would decrease funding for Washington’s public insurance program providing long-term care benefits and services.”

According to Howard Gleckman, Senior Fellow at the Urban-Brookings Tax Policy Center, “If adopted, Initiative 2124 would make participation in the Washington Cares program voluntary, effectively killing it.” Alicia Munnell, Center for Retirement Research at Boston College says “A program financed with voluntary contributions will almost certainly go into a death spiral for a number of reasons.”

The Tri-City Herald editorial board in eastern Washington wrote “Vote No on I-2124. The future of WA long-term care for the aging depends on it” Vice President of the Washington State Labor Council, Jackie Boschok, writes in the Everett Herald “Voting against I-2124 will keep a long term care benefit that many, especially women, are counting on.” WA State Nurses Association President Justin Gill wrote in the Cascadia Daily that a 'yes' vote on I-2124 causes direct harm to patients.
