= The Brothers Wilderness =

Wilderness area in Washington, United States

- IUCN category Ib (wilderness area)
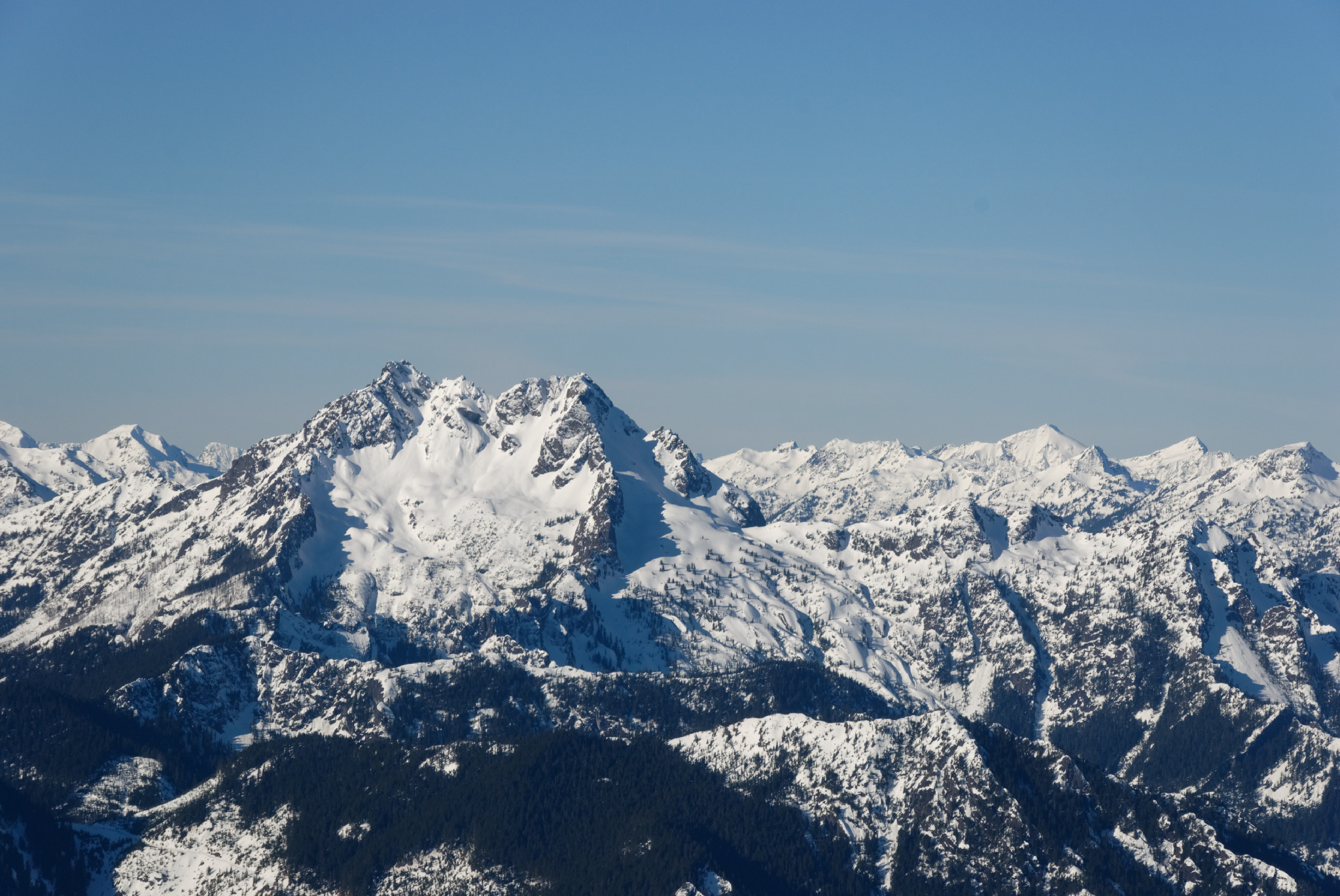
- East face of The Brothers in winter

- Location within the United States
- Location: Jefferson County, Washington, USA
- Nearest city: Quilcene, WA
- Coordinates: 47°41′55″N 123°05′33″W
- Area: 16,337 acres (6,611 ha)
- Established: 1984
- Governing body: U.S. Forest Service
- Website: The Brothers Wilderness

The Brothers Wilderness is a designated wilderness area located in the Olympic National Forest on the eastern side of the Olympic Peninsula south of Buckhorn Wilderness and north of Mount Skokomish Wilderness. The wilderness area comprises 16,337 acres (6,611 ha) administered by the U.S. Forest Service. The wilderness is named after The Brothers peaks, which are the tallest in the wilderness area at 6,866 feet (2,093 m). The Duckabush River flows through the middle of the area. The area lies in the rain shadow of the Olympic Mountains, receiving about 80 inches (2,000 mm) of annual precipitation.

== History ==
In 1984, the U.S. Congress established five wilderness areas within Olympic National Forest:

- Buckhorn Wilderness
- Colonel Bob Wilderness
- Mount Skokomish Wilderness
- The Brothers Wilderness
- Wonder Mountain Wilderness

The Brothers Wilderness sits along the eastern flank of the Olympic Wilderness, which was created in 1988.

== Recreation ==
Multiple trails can be used to reach The Brothers Wilderness for backpacking, mountain climbing, hunting, hiking, camping, and fishing. The three-mile Brothers Trail provides access to climbing routes up the double-summit peak of the same name. The Duckabush Trail follows the Duckabush River and then enters Olympic National Park. The eight-mile Mt. Jupiter Trail #809 is ranked as difficult and provides access to Jupiter Lakes.
