= Mike Chapman (politician) =

American customs inspector and politician

Member of the Washington State Senate from the 24th district
- Incumbent
- Assumed office December 6, 2024
- Preceded by: Kevin Van De Wege

Member of the Washington House of Representatives from the 24th district
- In office January 9, 2017 – December 6, 2024
- Preceded by: Kevin Van De Wege
- Succeeded by: Adam Bernbaum

Clallam County Commissioner
- In office January 1, 2001 – January 1, 2017
- Preceded by: Carole Y. Boardman
- Succeeded by: Randy Johnson

Personal details
- Born: 1963 (age 62–63) Washington, U.S.
- Party: Democratic (2007–present)
- Other political affiliations: Republican (before 2007)
- Spouse: Bobbi Chapman
- Children: 2
- Education: Shoreline Community College (AA); Northwest University (BA); Duquesne University (MA)

Michael C. Chapman (born 1963) is an American customs inspector and politician serving as a Democratic member of the Washington State Senate. He previously served as a member of the Washington State House of Representatives from 2017 to 2024.

== Political career ==
Chapman was a County Commissioner for Clallam County, Washington from 2009 to 2017.

Chapman was first elected to the state legislature in 2016. He was reelected in 2018 and 2020. Chapman represents the 24th Legislative District, which includes Clallam and Jefferson counties as well as parts of Grays Harbor County.

Chapman was elected to the Washington State Senate in November 2024 and was sworn in on December 6, 2024.

=== Electoral record ===
2016 top-two primary: Washington House of Representatives, District 24, Position 1
| Party | Candidate | Votes | % |
|---|---|---|---|
| Democratic | Mike Chapman | 16,506 | 46.34% |
| Republican | George Vrable | 13,239 | 37.17% |
| Democratic | Tammy Ramsay | 5,871 | 16.48% |

2016 general election: Washington House of Representatives, District 24, Position 1
| Party | Candidate | Votes | % |
|---|---|---|---|
| Democratic | Mike Chapman | 43,847 | 60.90% |
| Republican | George Vrable | 28,150 | 39.10% |

In 2018, Chapman and Jodi Wilke were the only candidates in the top-two primary for the District 24, Position 1 seat, so both advanced to the general election.

2018 general election: Washington House of Representatives, District 24, Position 1
| Party | Candidate | Votes | % |
|---|---|---|---|
| Democratic | Mike Chapman | 43,504 | 58.0% |
| Republican | Jodi Wilke | 31,525 | 42.0% |

== Personal life ==
Chapman and his wife, Bobbi, have two sons, and live in Port Angeles, Washington.

Before becoming an elected official, Chapman worked as a US Customs Inspector.
