= Colonel Bob Wilderness =

Protected area in Washington, US

- IUCN category Ib (wilderness area)
- Location within Washington (state) Location within the United States
- Location: Grays Harbor / Jefferson counties, Washington, USA
- Nearest city: Quinault, WA
- Coordinates: 47°24′N 123°45′W
- Area: 11,855 acres (47.98 km^{2})
- Established: 1984
- Governing body: U.S. Forest Service
- Website: Colonel Bob Wilderness

Colonel Bob Wilderness is a 11,855-acre (4,798 ha) protected area located in the southwest corner of Olympic National Forest in the state of Washington. It is named after 19th-century orator Robert Green Ingersoll. Lake Quinault lies about 15 miles (24 km) to the west. Elevations in the wilderness vary from 300 feet (91 m) to 4,509 feet (1,374 m) above sea level. The highest elevation is an unnamed peak; the second-highest elevation is Colonel Bob Mountain at 4,492 feet (1,369 m). The wilderness is a temperate rain forest with annual rainfall greater than 150 inches (3,800 mm).

== History ==
In 1984, the U.S. Congress established five wilderness areas within the Olympic National Forest:

- Buckhorn Wilderness
- Colonel Bob Wilderness
- Mount Skokomish Wilderness
- The Brothers Wilderness
- Wonder Mountain Wilderness

The Colonel Bob Wilderness sits on the southern flank of the Olympic Wilderness, which was created in 1988.

== Recreation ==
More than 12 miles (19 km) of trails provide access to the wilderness for backpacking, camping, hunting, and mountain climbing. Access by road is via South Shore Quinault Lake Road to the north, or FS Road 2204 to the south. Access by trail is by Colonel Bob Trail #851, Pete's Creek Trail #858, and Fletcher Canyon Trail #857.
