= The Brothers (Olympic Mountains) =

Mountains in Washington (state), United States

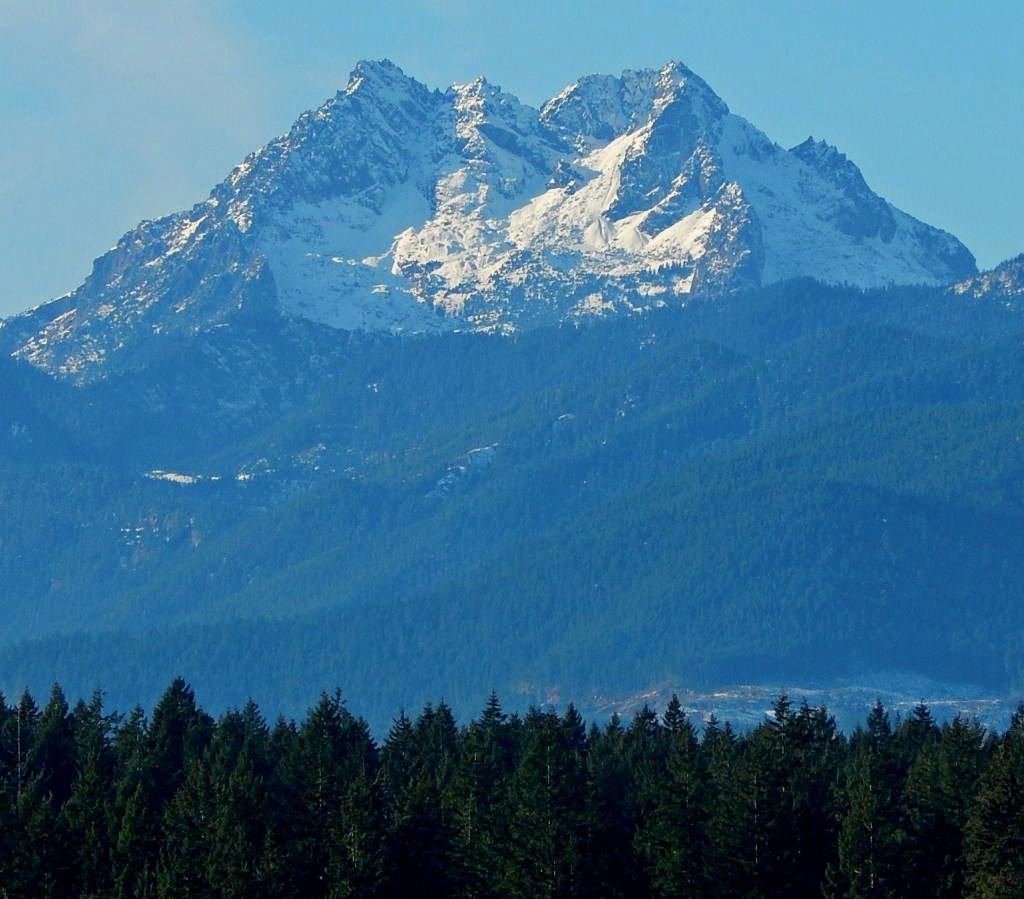
- East face in winter

Highest point
- Elevation: 6,842 ft (2,085 m) NGVD 29
- Prominence: 2,682 ft (817 m)
- Coordinates: 47°39′14″N 123°08′27″W

Geography
- Location within Washington (state) Location within the United States
- Location: Jefferson County, Washington U.S.
- Parent range: Olympic Mountains
- Topo map: USGS The Brothers

Geology
- Rock age: Eocene
- Rock type: Basalt

Climbing
- Easiest route: Scrambling

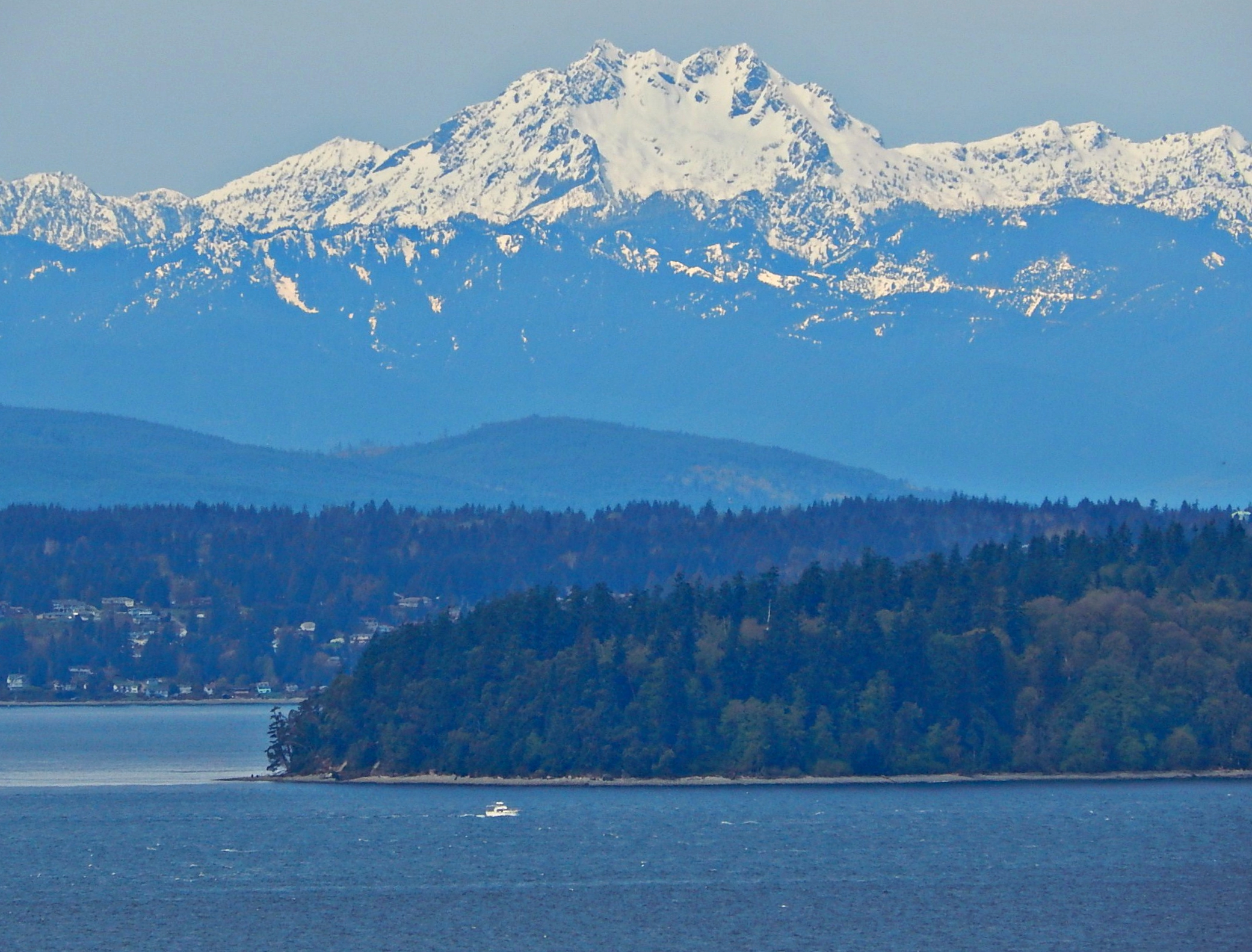
The Brothers seen from West Seattle

The Brothers are a pair of prominent peaks in the Olympic Mountains which are located in the Pacific Northwest, near Hood Canal in Washington state on the boundary between Olympic National Park and The Brothers Wilderness.

The south peak, rising to 6,842 feet (2,085 m), is 192 feet (59 m) higher than the north peak. No official trails approach the summit, but the south peak is considered a non-technical climb. The Brothers' distinctive double summit is clearly recognizable from Seattle.

In 1856, surveyor George Davidson named these mountains in honor of two brothers of Ellinor Fauntleroy, his future wife. He called the southern peak Mount Edward and northern peak Mount Arthur. A suggestion in late 1968 to rename the mountains "The Brothers Kennedy" in honor of John F. Kennedy and Robert F. Kennedy was not approved by the U.S. Board on Geographic Names.

== Climate ==
Set in the eastern portion of the Olympic Mountains, The Brothers is located in the marine west coast climate zone of western North America. Most weather fronts originate in the Pacific Ocean, and travel northeast toward the Olympic Mountains. As fronts approach, they are forced upward by the peaks of the Olympic Range, causing them to drop their moisture in the form of rain or snowfall (Orographic lift). As a result, the Olympics experience high precipitation, especially during the winter months in the form of snowfall. During winter months, weather is usually cloudy, but, due to high pressure systems over the Pacific Ocean that intensify during summer months, there is often little or no cloud cover during the summer. Because of maritime influence, snow tends to be wet and heavy, resulting in high avalanche danger.
