= Lilliwaup, Washington =

Unincorporated community in Washington, United States

- Unincorporated community
- Location within Washington (state) Location within the United States
- Country: United States
- State: Washington
- County: Mason
- Elevation: 3 ft (0.91 m)
- Time zone: UTC-8 (Pacific (PST))
  - Summer (DST): UTC-7 (PDT)
- GNIS feature ID: 1522086

Lilliwaup is a small unincorporated community in Mason County, Washington, United States. It is located on the west shore of Hood Canal at the mouth of Lilliwaup Creek. U.S. Route 101 passes through the town.

== History ==
The name "Lilliwaup" comes from the Twana word /sləláwap/, meaning "cove, inlet".

The area was settled by early pioneers by 1854. The town was officially platted in 1890. The Olympic Exploring Expedition of 1890, led by Joseph O'Neil, made one of the earliest explorations of the Olympic Mountains and the first crossing of the southern part of the range. The expedition began at Lilliwaup, bringing men and supplies up Hood Canal. O'Neil hoped to find a practical route between Hood Canal and the Pacific Ocean. The party left Lilliwaup in June 1890, west to the North Fork Skokomish River and Lake Cushman. From there a number of smaller parties explored in various directions, including one group that made the first recorded ascent of Mount Olympus. The main contingent of the expedition reached Hoquiam in October 1890. O'Neil did not find the practical route he had hoped for, but advocated for the creation of a national park.

When O'Neil's exploring expedition first arrived at Lilliwaup in early 1890 they found the town almost non-existent. A member of the party described Lilliwaup as "a town with one house". But in September of the same year, when O'Neil again traveled to Lake Cushman via Lilliwaup more than 30 families had moved in. Soon after there was a store and two hotels. However, the townsite company went bankrupt a short time later and most of the people moved away. By the 1920s tourism was bringing new life to the region. The Lilliwaup Land and Resort Company was founded. There were reports that movie stars such as Mary Pickford, Charlie Chaplin, and others were interested in buying homes in Lilliwaup, but they never came and the resort company folded.

== Recreation ==
A nearby fish hatchery keeps the local waters stocked with salmon, which draws fishing enthusiasts to the area in the fall.

A stairway provides public access to the round-rock beach, where picnicking, shellfish harvesting, fishing, and beachcombing are popular. Hood Canal oysters plucked from the shores are a local favorite.
