= Olympic National Forest =

Protected area in Washington state, US

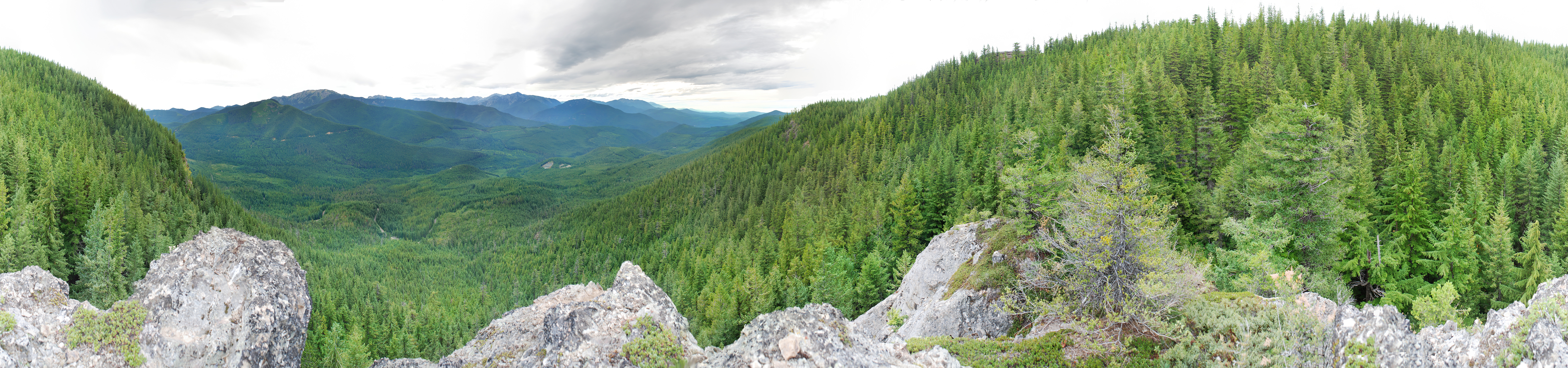
- Panorama view from Mount Zion

- Location within Washington (state) Location within the United States
- Location: Washington, U.S.
- Nearest city: Quinault, WA
- Coordinates: 47°48′35.9″N 123°4′0.2″W
- Area: 628,115 acres (2,541.89 km^{2})
- Established: February 22, 1897
- Governing body: U.S. Forest Service
- Website: Olympic National Forest

Olympic National Forest is a U.S. National Forest located in Washington. With an area of 628,115 acres (254,189 ha), it nearly surrounds Olympic National Park and the Olympic Mountain range. Olympic National Forest contains parts of Clallam, Grays Harbor, Jefferson, and Mason counties. The landscape of the national forest varies, from the temperate Olympic rain forest to the salt water fjord of Hood Canal to the peaks of Mt. Washington.

Annual precipitation averages about 220 inches (5,600 mm), giving rise to streams such as the Humptulips River.

Olympic National Forest was originally created as Olympic Forest Reserve in 1897, then renamed to Olympic National Forest in 1907. A portion of the National Forest became the Mount Olympus National Monument in 1909, which was later designated Olympic National Park.

A 1993 Forest Service study estimated that the extent of old growth in the Forest was 266,800 acres (108,000 ha). It is administered in two ranger districts: the Pacific Ranger District on the west side of the Olympic Peninsula, and the Hood Canal Ranger District on the east side.

Forest headquarters are located in Olympia, with ranger district offices in Forks, Quinault, and Quilcene. The former office in Hoodsport closed in 2005, and now houses a local Chamber of Commerce, which still sells Northwest Forest Passes.

Other Washington towns near entrances of the forest include Port Angeles, Sequim, and Amanda Park.

== Points of interest ==
Geographic Features

- Lake Cushman
- Quinault Rain Forest
- Lake Quinault
- Wynoochee Dam
- Lake Crescent
- Mount Lincoln

=== Wilderness areas ===
- The Brothers Wilderness
- Buckhorn Wilderness
- Colonel Bob Wilderness
- Mt. Skokomish Wilderness
- Wonder Mountain Wilderness
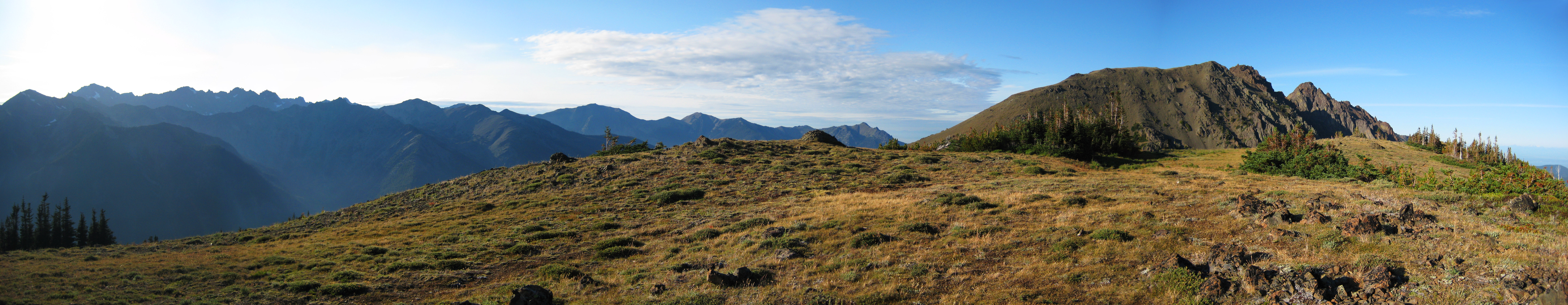
Panorama looking West-Northwest to Northeast from Marmot Pass in the Buckhorn Wilderness. Buckhorn Mountain and Iron Mountain can be seen on the far right side.

== Wild Olympics ==
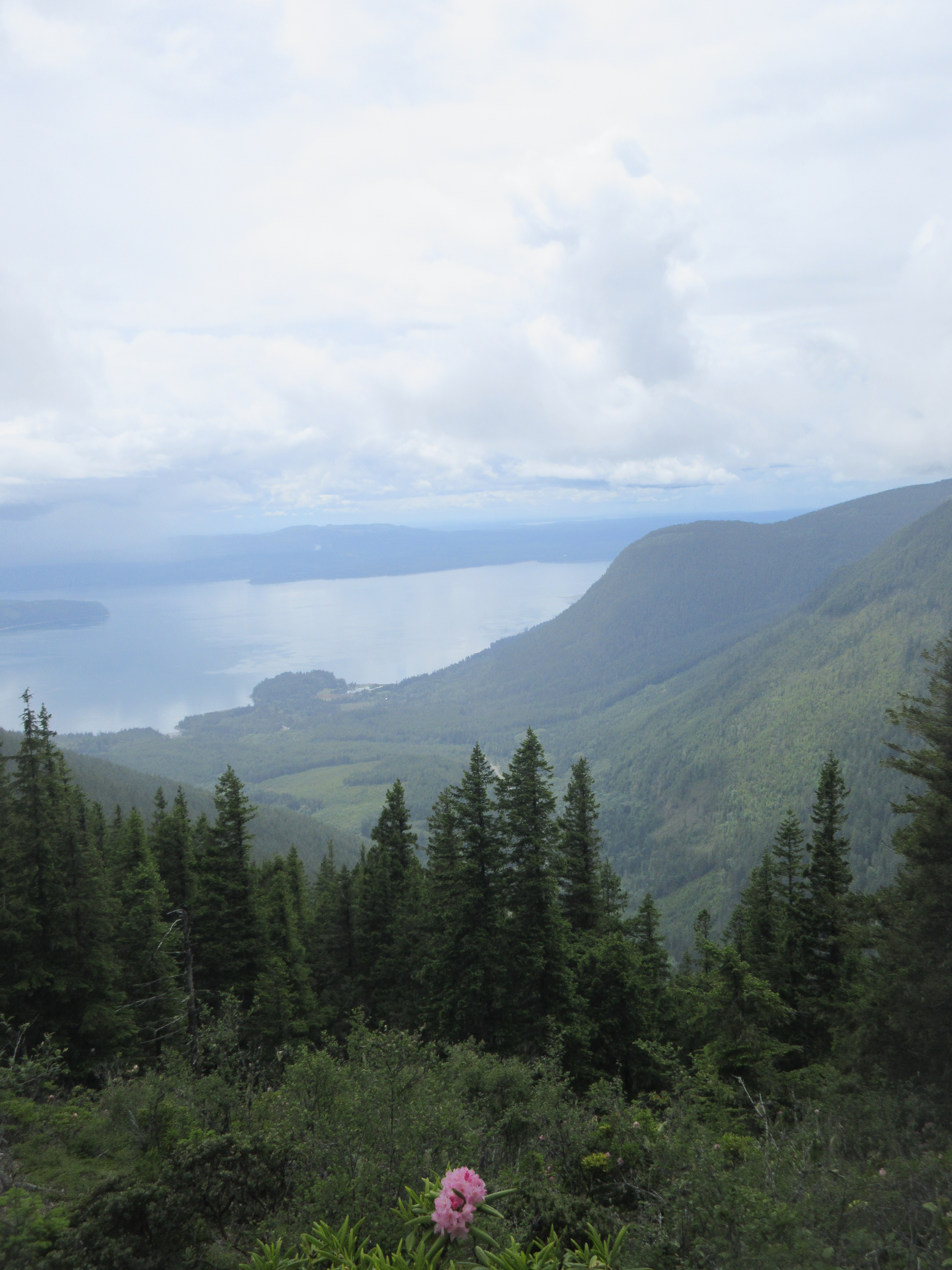
View of Puget Sound from the top of Mt. Walker

The "Wild Olympics" campaign is an effort to designate additional areas on the Olympic Peninsula as protected.

Under a bill introduced by United States Senator Patty Murray in January 2014 logging on an additional 126,554 acres (51,215 ha) (20%) of the Olympic National Forest's lands would be disallowed under the creation of nine new wilderness areas and expansion of the five existing ones. Wild and Scenic River designations would extend to 19 rivers, including those originating in the Olympic National Park, such as the Quinault River, Hoh River, Elwha River, and Hamma Hamma River, and some that do not, like the middle fork of the Satsop River. According to The Oregonian, "the wilderness designation would permanently protect old growth and ancient forest habitat throughout the region. The wild and scenic rivers designation would add federal recognition to the outstanding river systems on the peninsula, protecting them as a source of clean drinking water and helping to keep Puget Sound clean for generations. This designation does not restrict private property rights."

Like the Northern Spotted Owl controversy two decades earlier, the action has met opposition from some residents on and near the Olympic Peninsula who see it as a threat to their livelihoods. Handmade "Stop Wild Olympics" signs can be seen in the Aberdeen area and on the peninsula, expressing displeasure, and an opposition group, Working Wild Olympics, was set up in 2011. The effort has the support of dozens of "major hunting and fishing organizations" who see it as a way to sustain elk, salmon and other fish. Debate on the topic in 2014 has included community meetings drawing hundreds of individuals on both sides, and full-page advertisements in local newspapers.

An episode of This American Land concerning the Wild Olympics proposal showed nationally on PBS in 2014.

The Wild Olympics Wilderness and Wild and Scenic Rivers Act was reintroduced in 2019 as H.R.2642 and received a hearing in the House Natural Resources Subcommittee on National Parks, Forests, and Public Lands.

== See also ==
- List of national forests of the United States
