= Washington's 24th legislative district =

American legislative district

Coordinates: 47°35′N 123°40′W

Map of Washington's 24th legislative district

Washington's 24th legislative district is one of forty-nine districts in Washington state for representation in the state legislature.

The district encompasses most of the Olympic Peninsula, including all of Clallam and Jefferson counties and most of Grays Harbor County.

The district's legislators are state senator Mike Chapman and state representatives Adam Bernbaum (position 1) and Steve Tharinger (position 2), all Democrats.

== See also ==
- Washington Redistricting Commission
- Washington State Legislature
- Washington State Senate
- Washington House of Representatives
