= Copper Mountain (Mason County, Washington) =

Mountain in Washington (state), United States

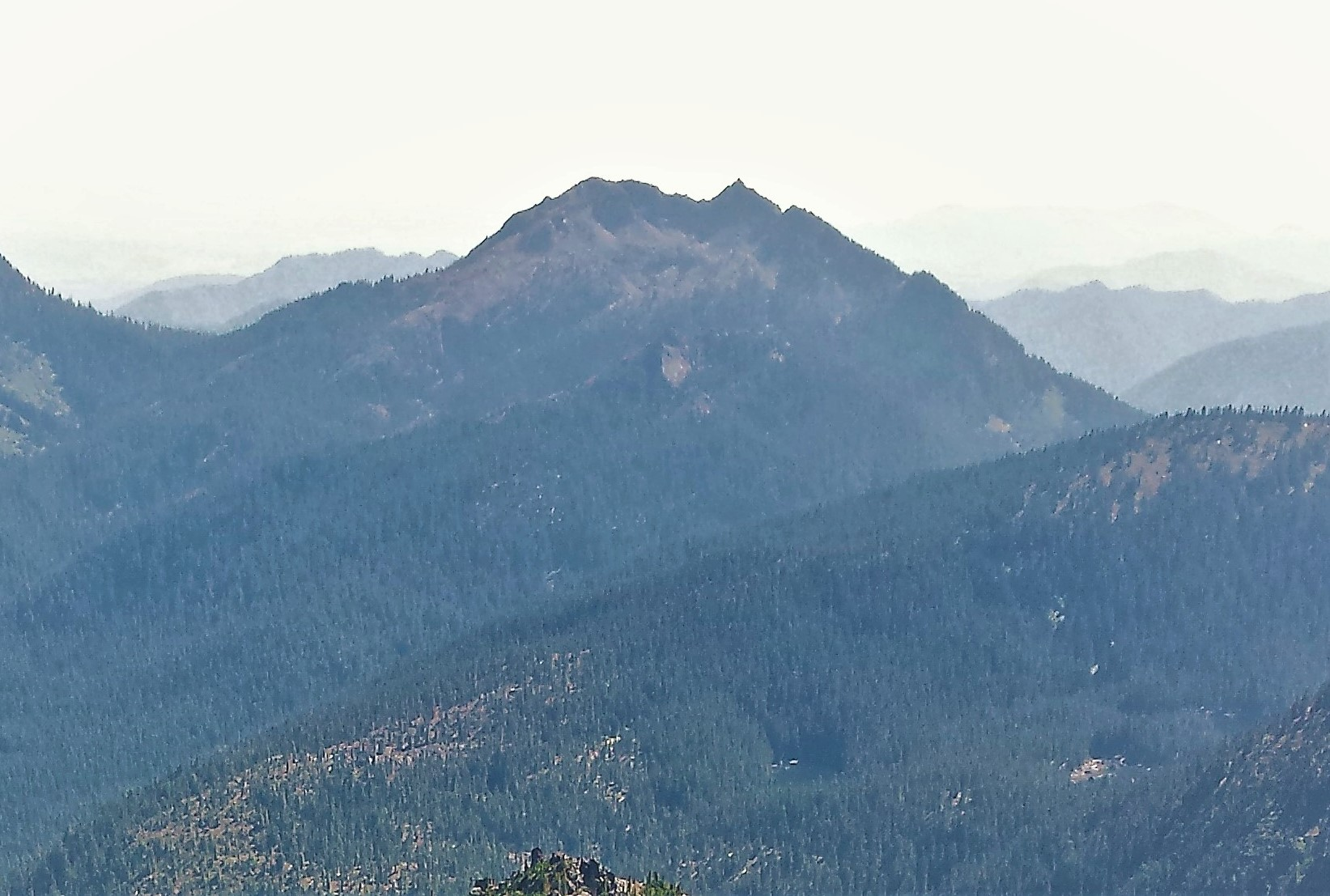
- North aspect, from Mt. Skokomish

Highest point
- Elevation: 5,425 ft (1,654 m)
- Prominence: 1,345 ft (410 m)
- Parent peak: Mount Ellinor (5,940 ft)
- Isolation: 1.36 mi (2.19 km)
- Coordinates: 47°31′22″N 123°17′47″W

Geography
- Location within Washington (state) Location within the United States
- Country: United States
- State: Washington
- County: Mason
- Protected area: Olympic National Park; Mount Skokomish Wilderness
- Parent range: Olympic Mountains
- Topo map: USGS Mount Skokomish

Geology
- Rock age: Eocene

Climbing
- Easiest route: class 2 via Wagonwheel Lake

Copper Mountain is a 5,425-foot (1,654 m) mountain summit located in the southeast portion of the Olympic Mountains, in Mason County of Washington state. It is situated on the boundary shared by Daniel J. Evans Wilderness and Mount Skokomish Wilderness, as well as the shared common border of Olympic National Park with Olympic National Forest. The nearest higher neighbor is Mount Ellinor, 1.67 miles (2.69 km) to the east. Wagonwheel Lake lies immediately north of the peak. Topographic relief is significant as the summit rises nearly 4,700 feet (1,433 m) above the Staircase Ranger Station at Lake Cushman in approximately 1.5 miles (2.4 km). Precipitation runoff from the mountain drains north into the Hamma Hamma River, and south into the North Fork Skokomish River, thence Lake Cushman.

== Climate ==
Copper Mountain is located in the marine west coast climate zone of western North America. Weather fronts originating in the Pacific Ocean travel northeast toward the Olympic Mountains. As fronts approach, they are forced upward by the peaks (orographic lift), causing them to drop their moisture in the form of rain or snow. As a result, the Olympics experience high precipitation, especially during the winter months in the form of snowfall. Because of maritime influence, snow tends to be wet and heavy, resulting in avalanche danger. During winter months weather is usually cloudy, but due to high pressure systems over the Pacific Ocean that intensify during summer months, there is often little or no cloud cover during the summer. The months April through October offer the most favorable weather for climbing or viewing.

== Etymology ==
The mountain was named on July 7, 1890, by Lieutenant Joseph P. O'Neil (1863–1938), United States Army officer who led the 1885 and 1890 O'Neil Expeditions to explore the interior of the Olympic Mountains. Earlier that same year, prospectors had discovered copper ore on the mountain.

== Geology ==
The Olympic Mountains are composed of obducted clastic wedge material and oceanic crust, primarily Eocene sandstone, turbidite, and basaltic oceanic crust. The mountains were sculpted during the Pleistocene era by erosion and glaciers advancing and retreating multiple times.

== Gallery ==
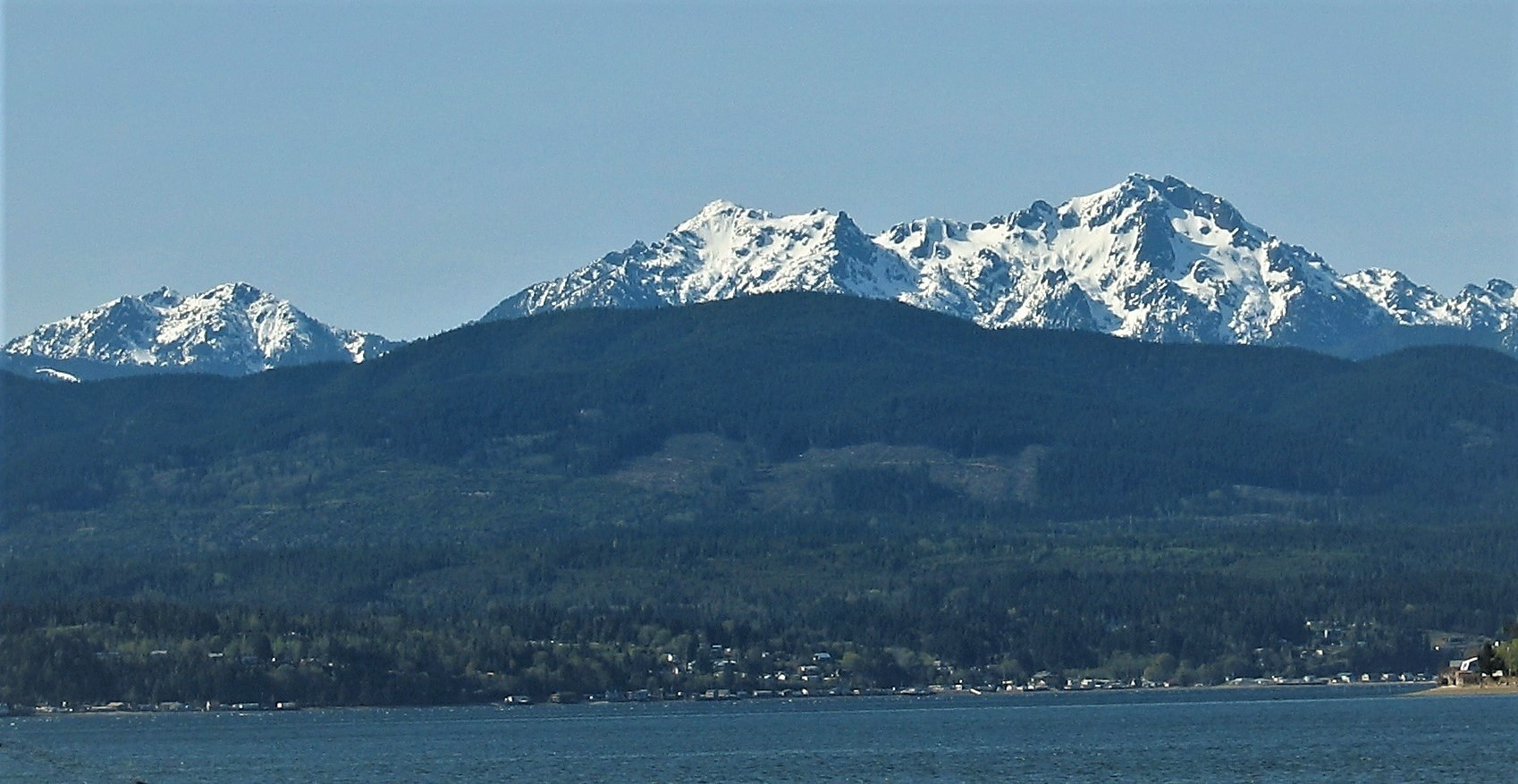
Copper Mountain (left), Mount Ellinor centered, Mount Washington (right) seen from the southeast on Hood Canal.

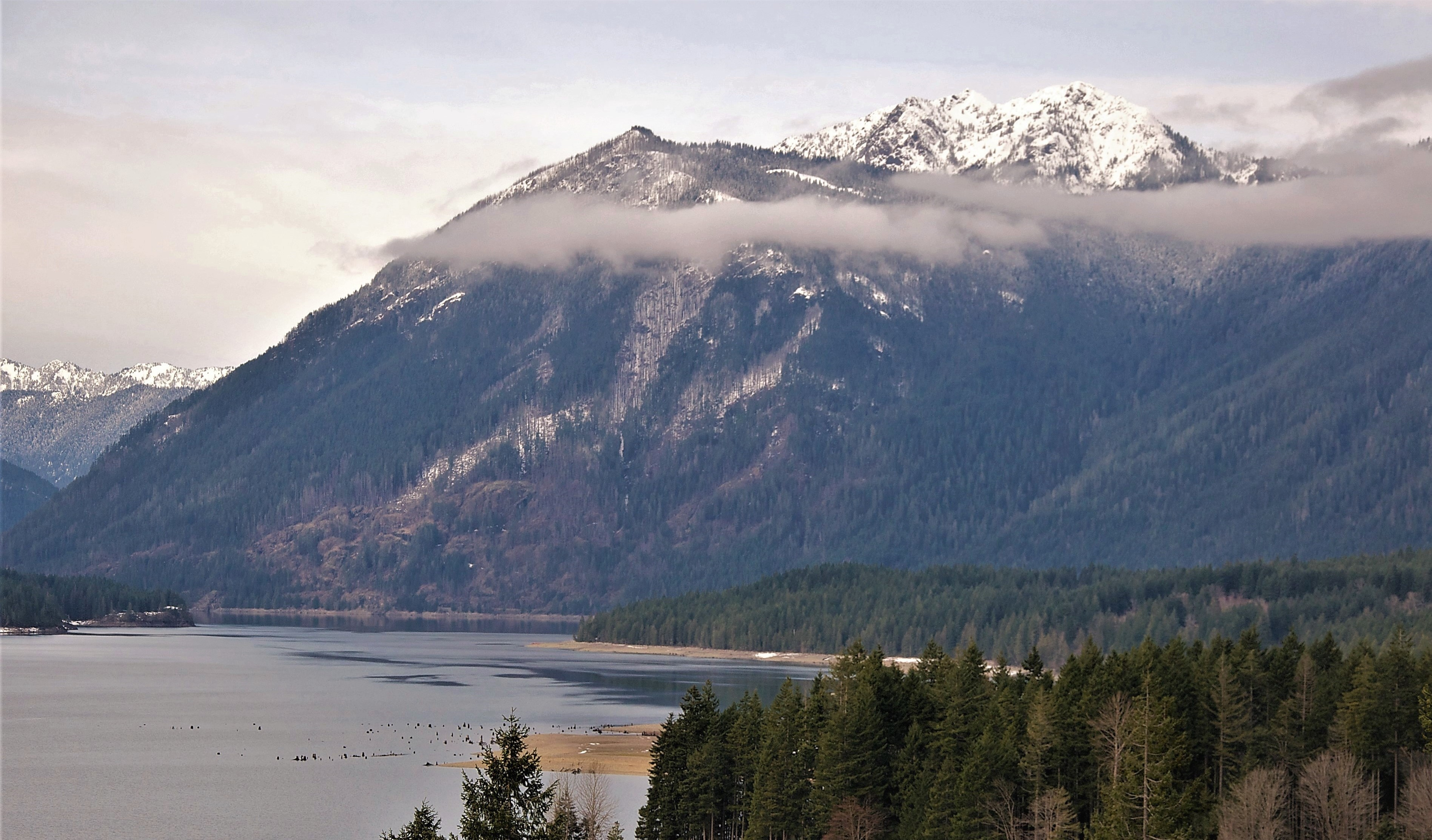
Snow-covered Copper Mountain behind Mount Rose, from Lake Cushman.

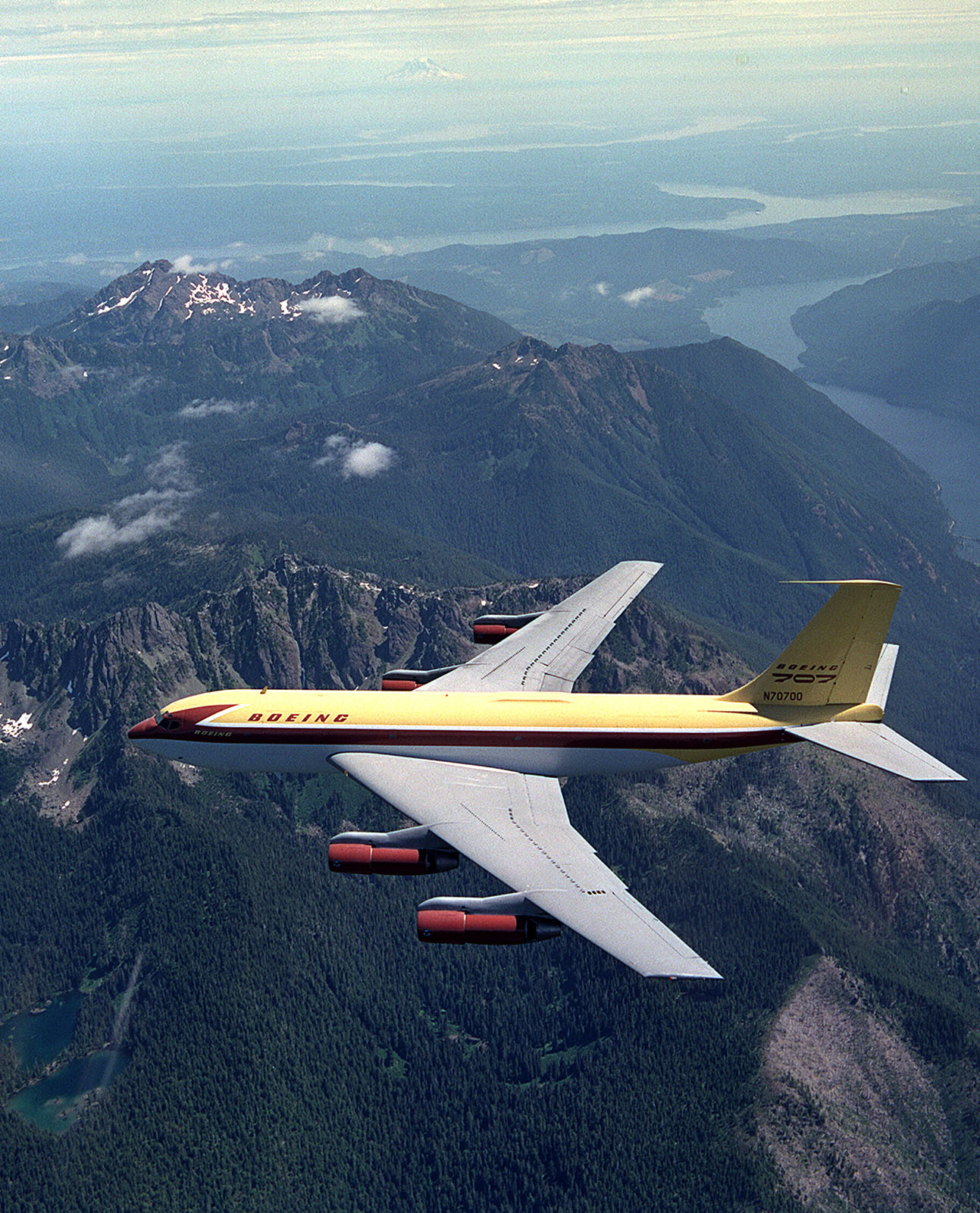
Mt. Washington and Mt. Ellinor (top left), Copper Mountain below that to right.
Mt. Lincoln behind plane.

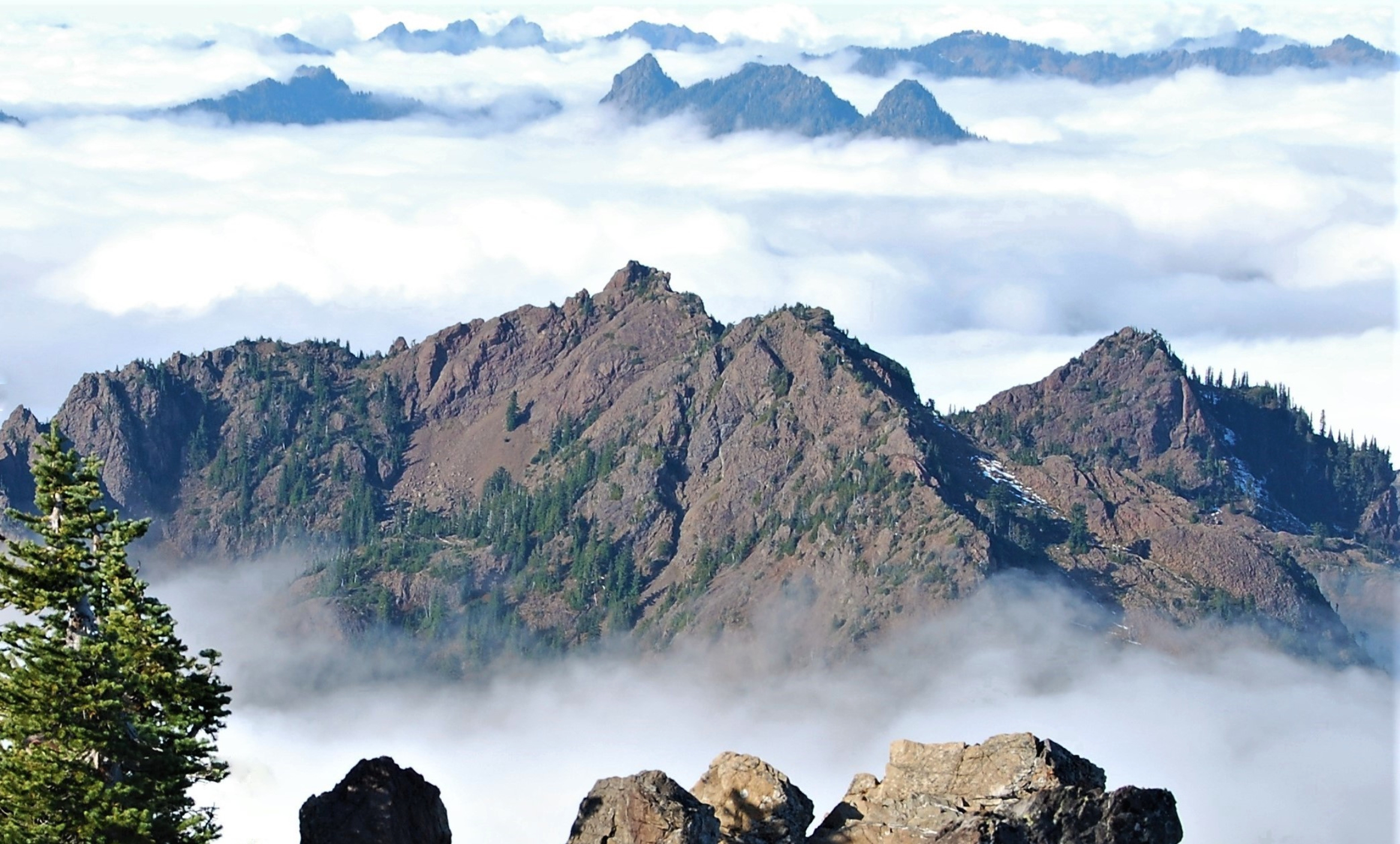
Copper from Ellinor

== See also ==
- Geology of the Pacific Northwest
- Olympic Mountains
