= Mount Rose (Washington) =

Mountain in Washington (state), United States

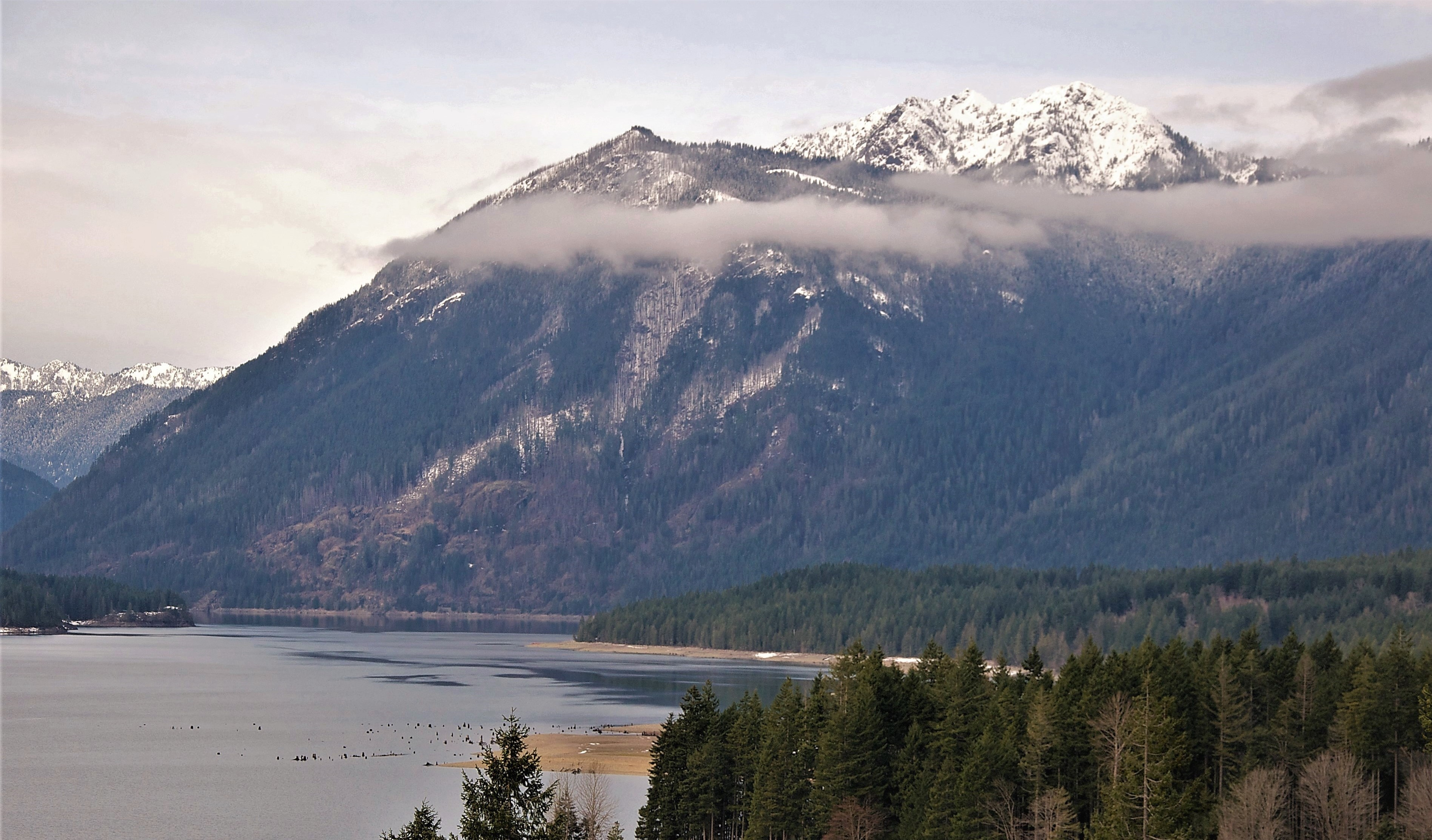
- Southeast aspect of Mt. Rose, centered (Copper Mountain behind, to right)

Highest point
- Elevation: 4,301 ft (1,311 m)
- Prominence: 381 ft (116 m)
- Parent peak: Copper Mountain (5,425 ft)
- Isolation: 1.22 mi (1.96 km)
- Coordinates: 47°30′21″N 123°17′21″W

Naming
- Etymology: Alfred A. Rose

Geography
- Location within Washington (state) Location within the United States
- Country: United States
- State: Washington
- County: Mason
- Protected area: Mount Skokomish Wilderness
- Parent range: Olympic Mountains
- Topo map: USGS Mount Skokomish

Geology
- Rock age: Eocene

Climbing
- Easiest route: class 2 trail

Mount Rose is a 4,301-foot-elevation (1,311-meter) mountain summit located in the southeast portion of the Olympic Mountains, in Mason County of Washington state. It is situated in the Mount Skokomish Wilderness, on land managed by Olympic National Forest. The nearest higher neighbor is line parent Copper Mountain, 1.2 mi (1.9 km) to the north, and Mount Ellinor is 1.7 mi (2.7 km) to the northeast. Precipitation runoff from the mountain drains into Lake Cushman, and topographic relief is significant as the summit rises approximately 3,600 feet (1,100 m) above the lake in less than one mile. Old-growth forests of Douglas fir, western hemlock, and western redcedar grow on the slopes surrounding the peak. In 2006, the Bear Gulch Fire scorched 750 acres of forest on the slopes of Mount Rose from lake level to the summit. Another Bear Gulch Fire started on July 6, 2025, near Mount Rose and burned mostly uncontained though the summer. Access to the summit is via the 3.2-mile-long Mt. Rose Trail which gains 3,500 feet of elevation.

== Climate ==
Mount Rose iis located in the marine west coast climate zone of western North America. Weather fronts originating in the Pacific Ocean travel northeast toward the Olympic Mountains. As fronts approach, they are forced upward by the peaks (orographic lift), causing them to drop their moisture in the form of rain or snow. As a result, the Olympics experience high precipitation, especially during the winter months in the form of snowfall. Because of maritime influence, snow tends to be wet and heavy, resulting in avalanche danger. During winter months weather is usually cloudy, but due to high pressure systems over the Pacific Ocean that intensify during summer months, there is often little or no cloud cover during the summer. The months April through October offer the most favorable weather for climbing or viewing the peak.

== Etymology ==
The mountain's toponym has been officially adopted by the United States Board on Geographic Names to commemorate Alfred A. Rose, who was the first settler to the Lake Cushman area in 1885, where he farmed on 150 acres with his wife and three children. He died of smallpox in 1889.

== Gallery ==
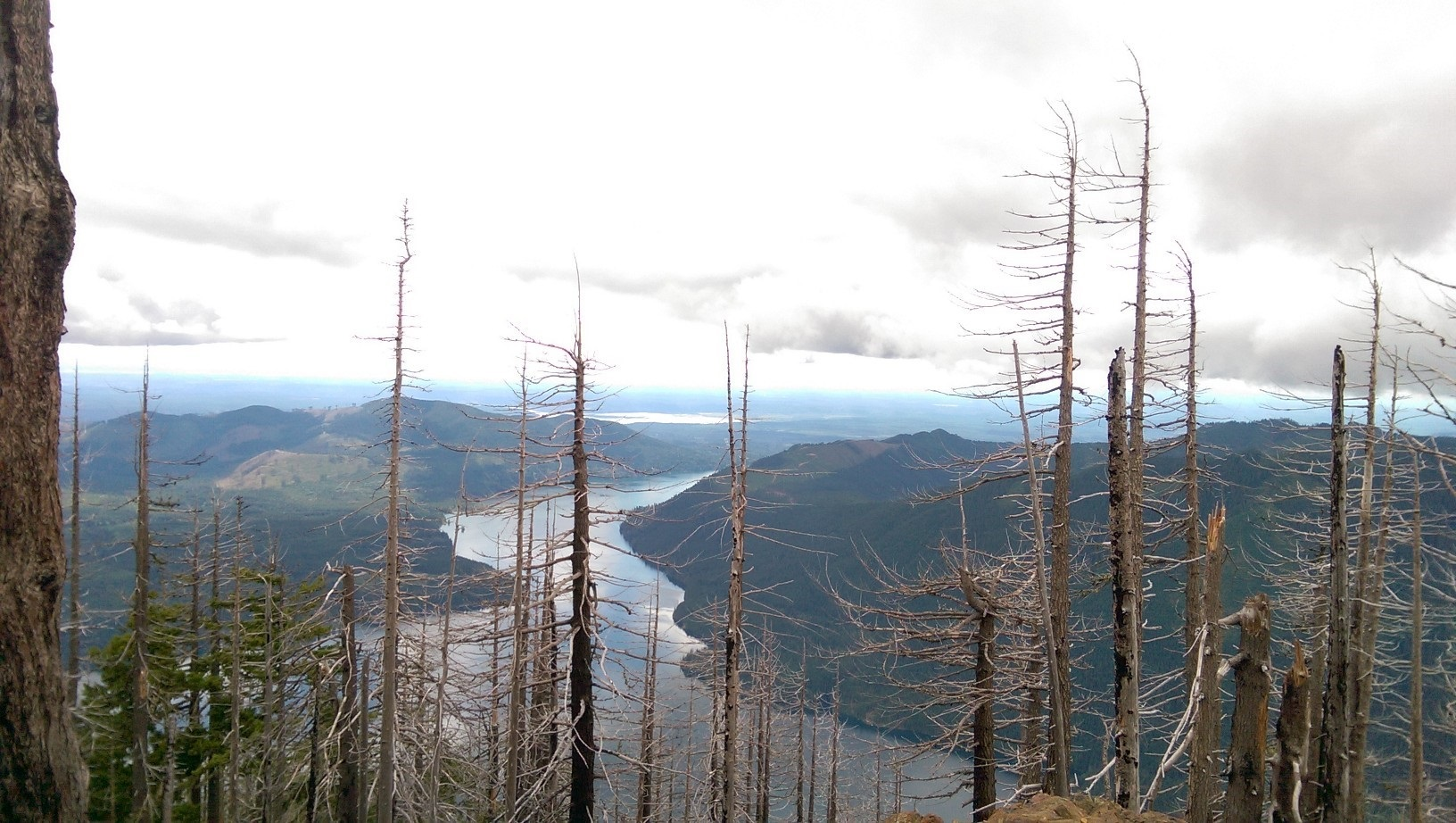
Looking southeast from Mt. Rose at Lake Cushman, note the trees burned in 2006.

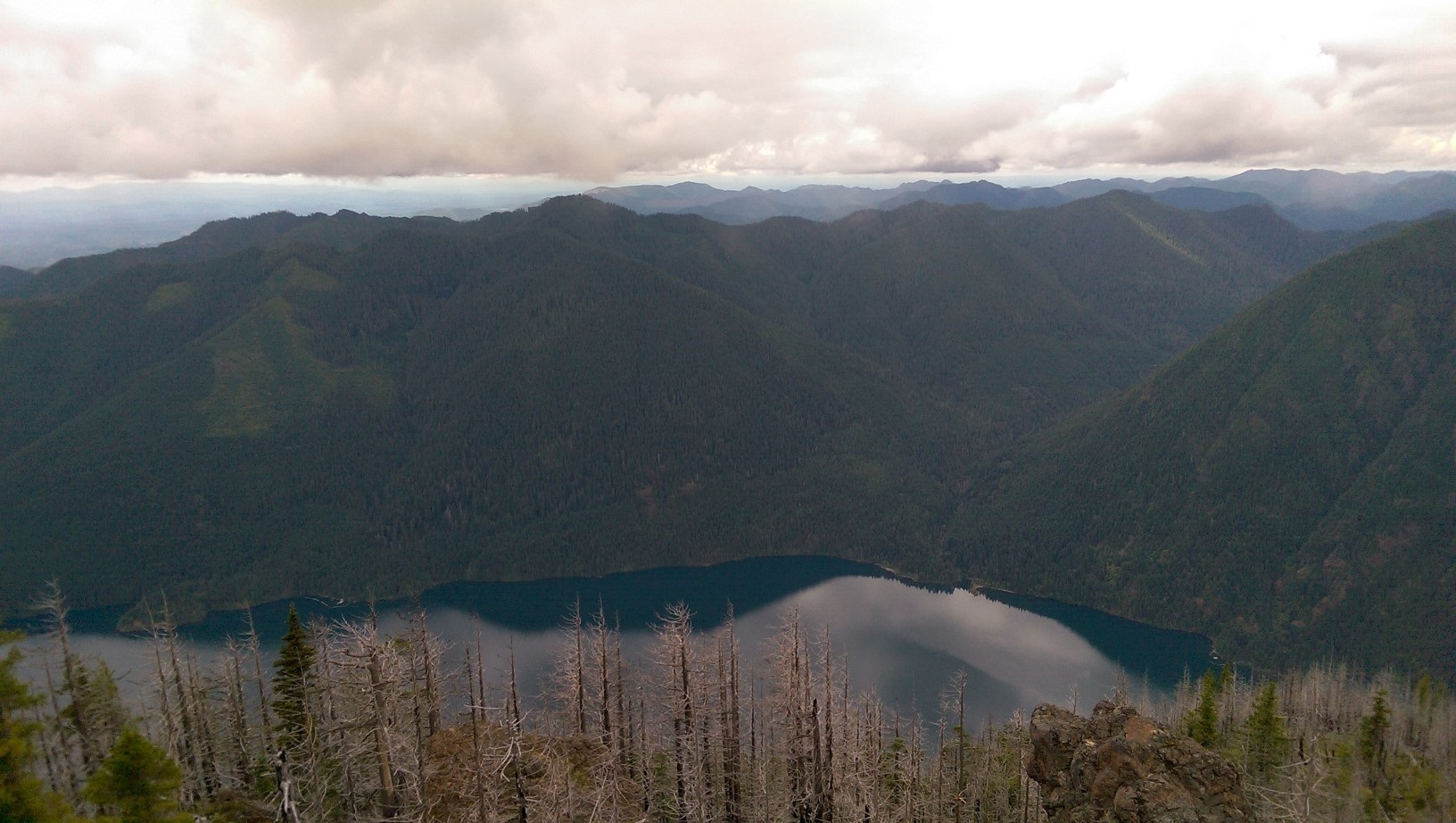
Looking south from Mt. Rose at Prospect Ridge

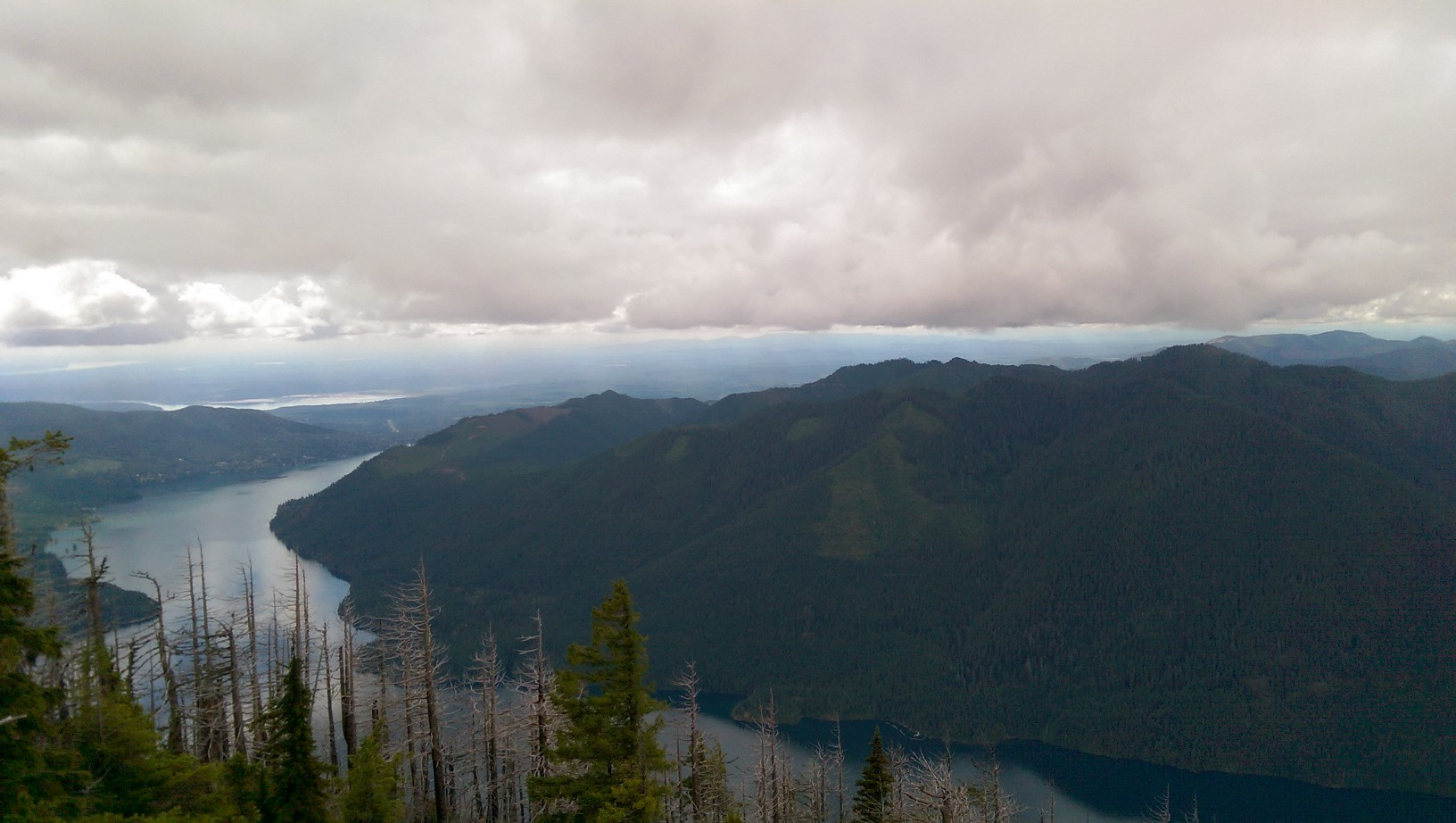
View of Lake Cushman from Mt. Rose

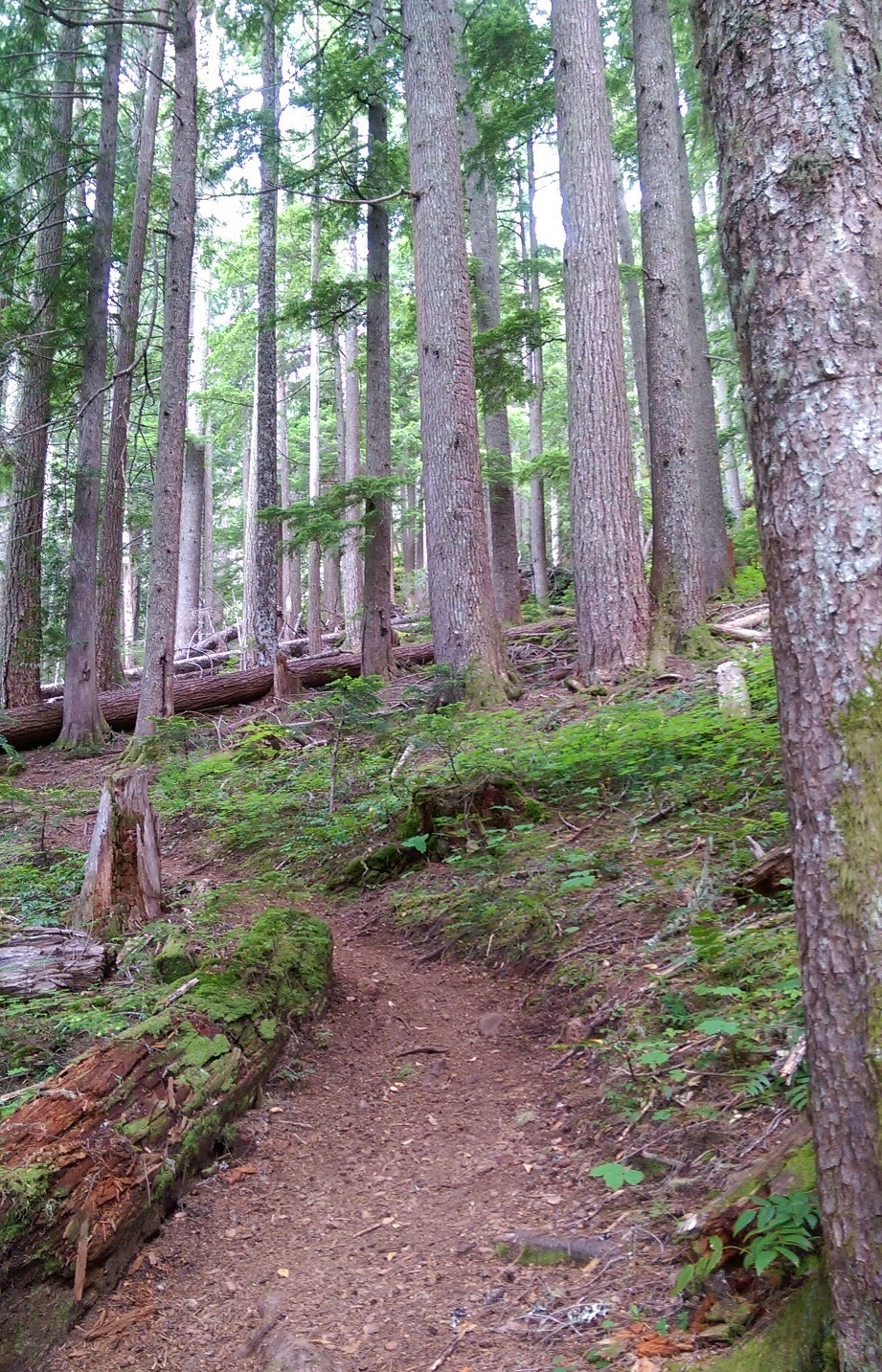
Trail to Mt. Rose

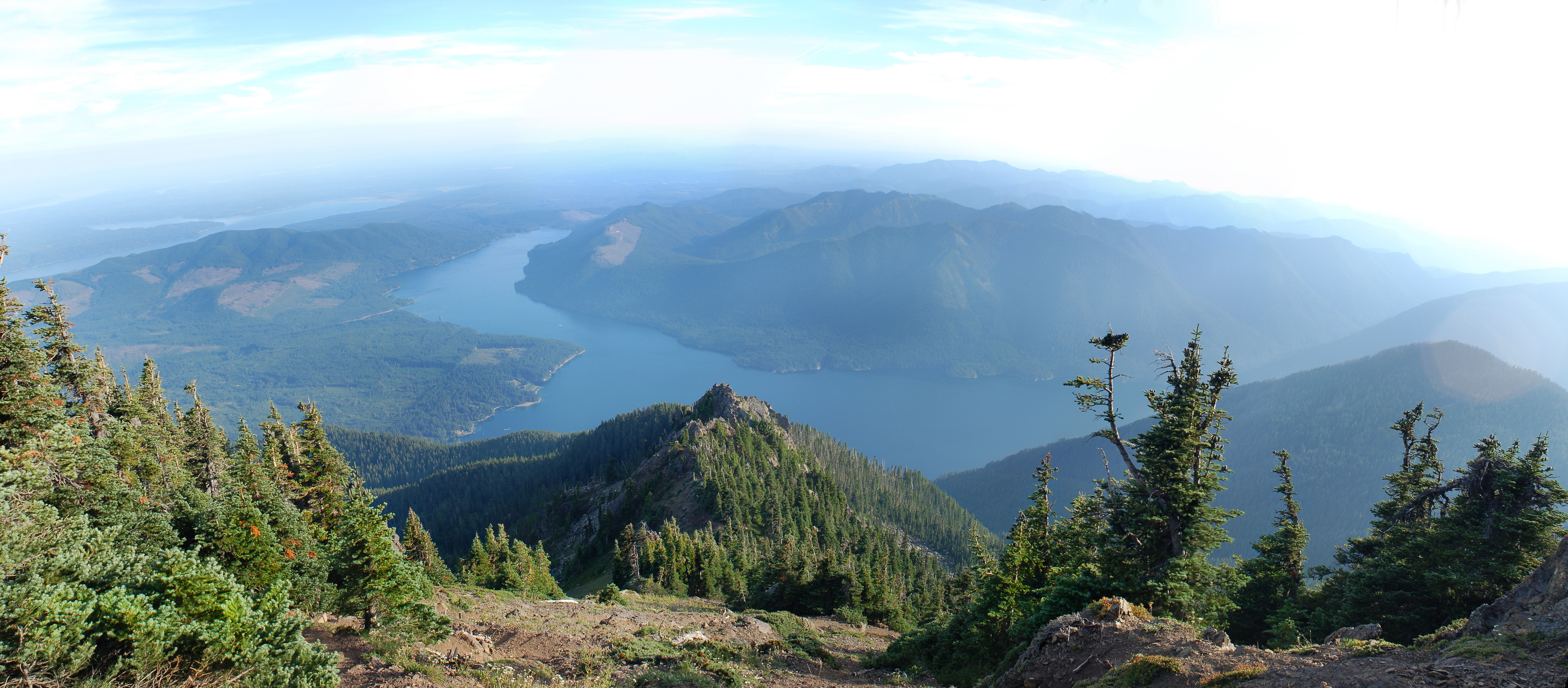
View from Mount Ellinor with Mount Rose to far right

== See also ==
- Geology of the Pacific Northwest
- Olympic Mountains
