= Mount Cruiser =

Mountain in Washington (state), United States

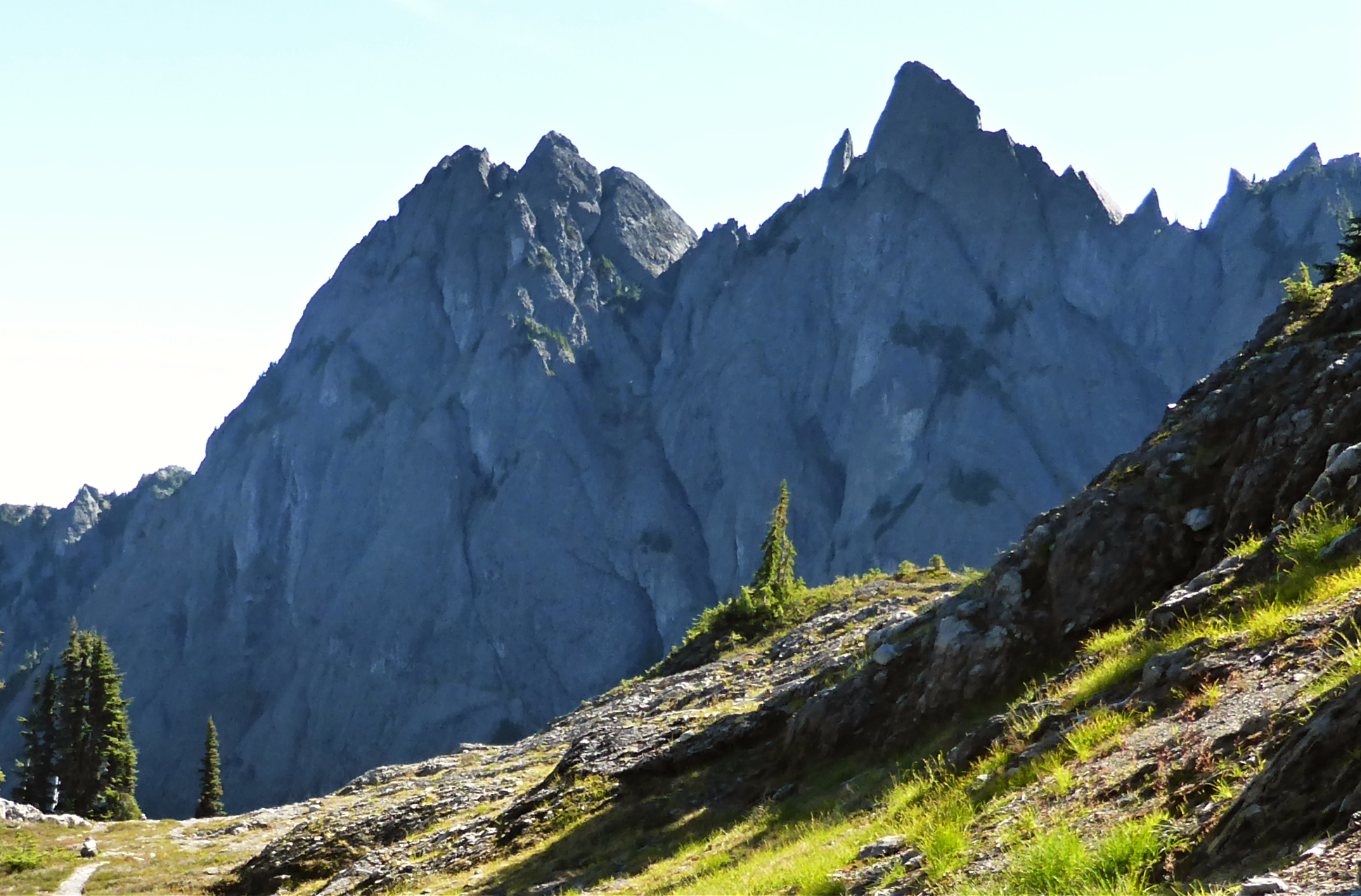
- Mt. Cruiser, west aspect, seen from Mt. Gladys, (Alpha on left)

Highest point
- Elevation: 6,104 ft (1,860 m)
- Prominence: 1,104 ft (336 m)
- Parent peak: Mount Skokomish (6,434 ft)
- Coordinates: 47°33′52″N 123°18′56″W

Geography
- Location within Washington (state) Location within the United States
- Country: United States
- State: Washington
- County: Mason
- Protected area: Mount Skokomish Wilderness
- Parent range: Olympic Mountains
- Topo map: USGS Mount Skokomish

Geology
- Rock age: Eocene
- Rock type: Basalt

Climbing
- First ascent: 1937 Paul Crews, Ray Layton
- Easiest route: class 5 South corner

Mount Cruiser is a 6,104-foot-elevation (1,860-meter) mountain summit located in the Olympic Mountains, in Mason County of Washington state, United States. It is situated in Mount Skokomish Wilderness on land managed by Olympic National Forest. Cruiser is the highest point on Sawtooth Ridge, and its nearest higher peak is Mount Skokomish, 2.1 mi (3.4 km) to the north-northeast. Cruiser has two sub-peaks, Alpha (6,040 ft; 1,841 m), and Beta (5,920 ft; 1,804 m), the latter of which lies on the Olympic National Park boundary. The first ascent of the peak was made in 1937 by Paul Crews and Ray Layton. The mountain was named by the first ascent party to recognize their club, the Bremerton Ski Cruisers. The mountain's toponym was officially adopted in 1961 by the United States Board on Geographic Names. Precipitation runoff from the mountain drains into the Hamma Hamma River.

== Climate ==
Mount Cruiser is located in the marine west coast climate zone of western North America. Weather fronts originating in the Pacific Ocean travel northeast toward the Olympic Mountains. As fronts approach, they are forced upward by the peaks (orographic lift), causing them to drop their moisture in the form of rain or snow. As a result, the Olympics experience high precipitation, especially during the winter months in the form of snowfall. Because of maritime influence, snow tends to be wet and heavy, resulting in avalanche danger. During winter months weather is usually cloudy, but due to high pressure systems over the Pacific Ocean that intensify during summer months, there is often little or no cloud cover during the summer. The months June through September offer the most favorable weather for climbing.

== Geology ==
The Olympic Mountains are composed of obducted clastic wedge material and oceanic crust, primarily Eocene sandstone, turbidite, and basaltic oceanic crust. The mountains were sculpted during the Pleistocene era by erosion and glaciers advancing and retreating multiple times.

== Climbing Routes ==
Established rock climbing routes on Mt. Cruiser:

- South Corner - class 5.0
- West-Southwest Corner - class 5.7
- Northeast Face - class 5.6
- West Face - class 5.5
- East Face - class 5.7
- Southeast Face - class 5.5

== Gallery ==
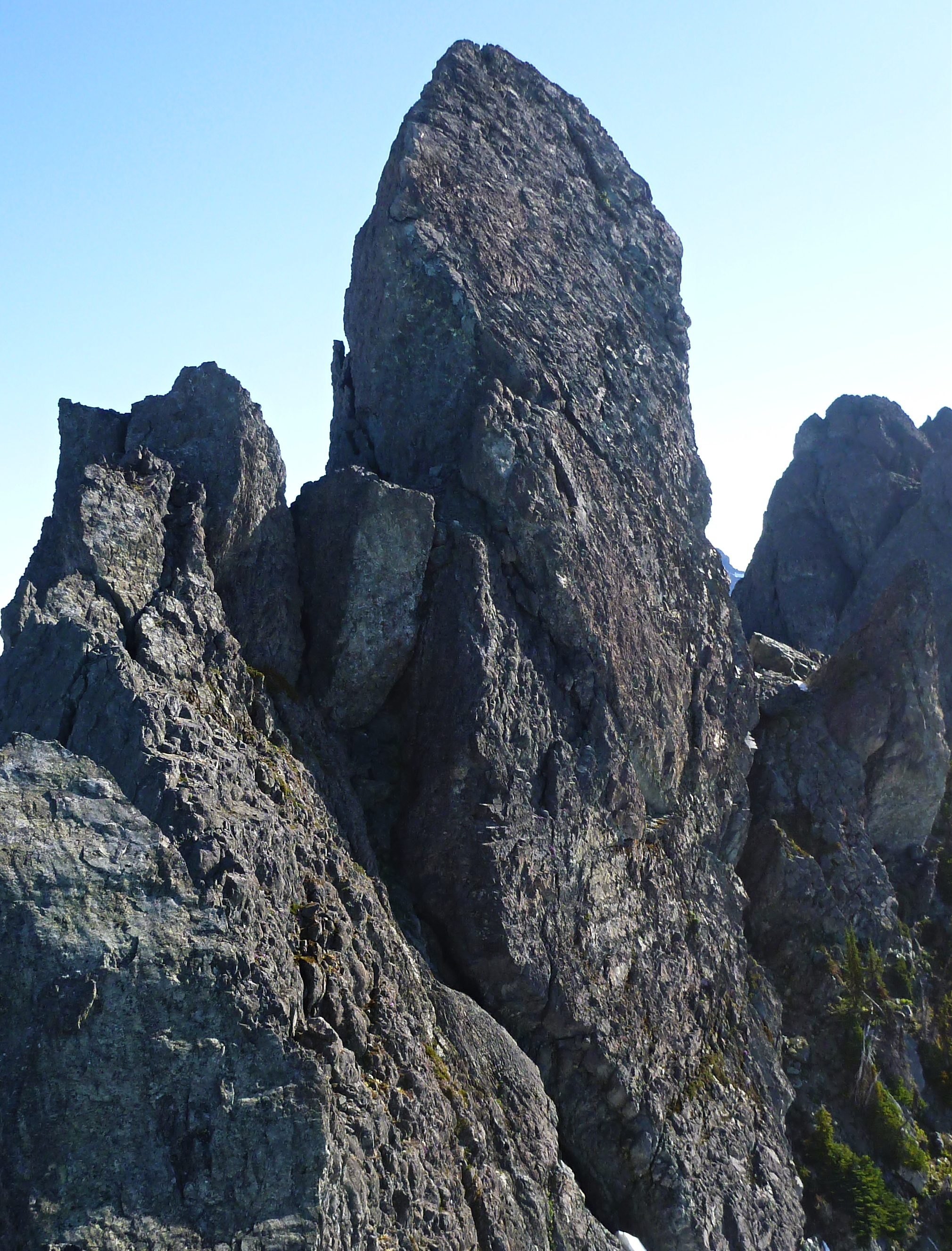
Cruiser summit

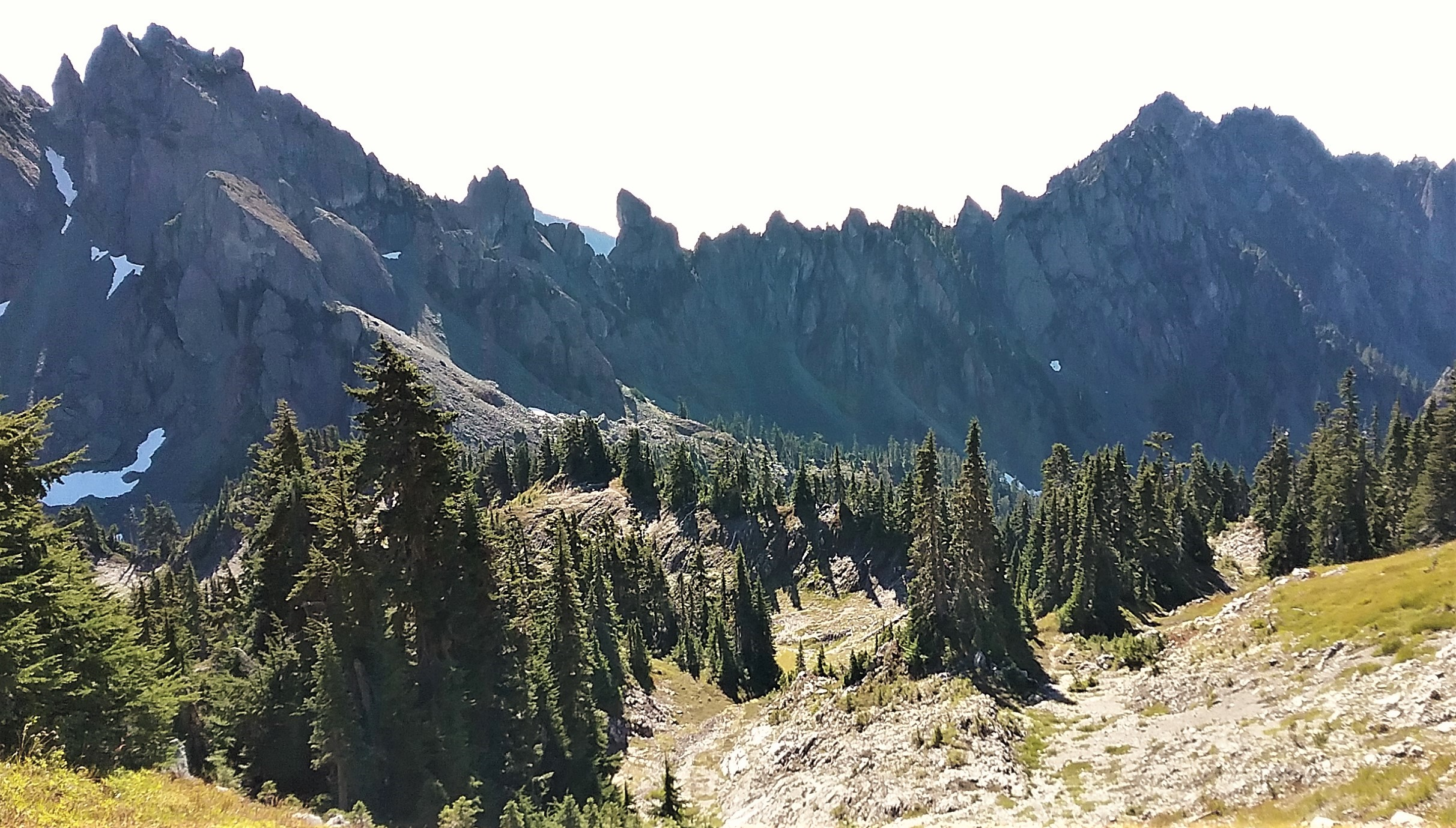
Mount Cruiser's Beta (left) and Mount Lincoln (right) seen from Mt. Gladys

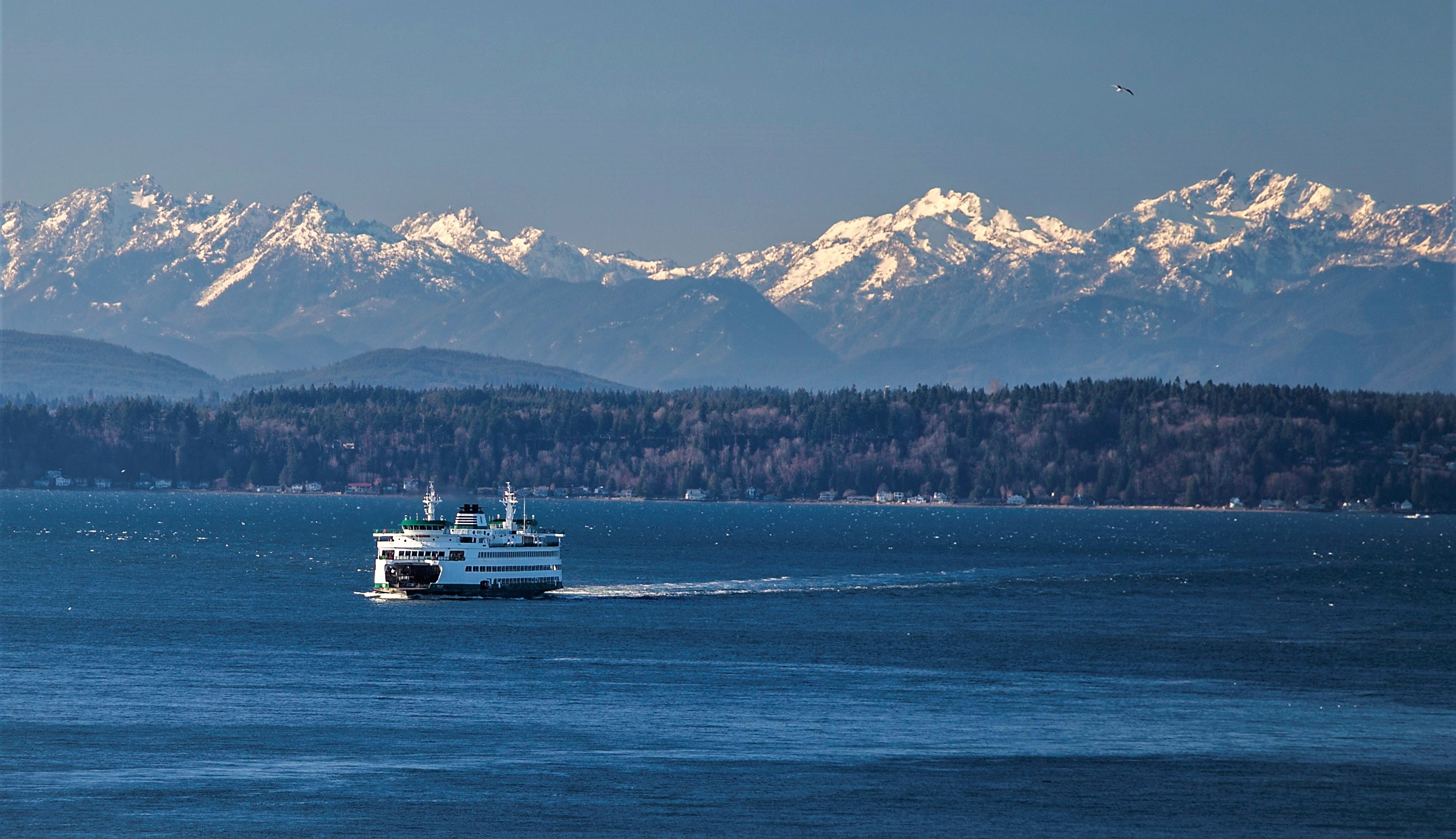
Mt. Cruiser (directly above ferry) seen from the Seattle area

== See also ==
- Geology of the Pacific Northwest
- Mount Lincoln
