= Mount Henderson (Washington) =

Mountain in Mason County, Washington, United States

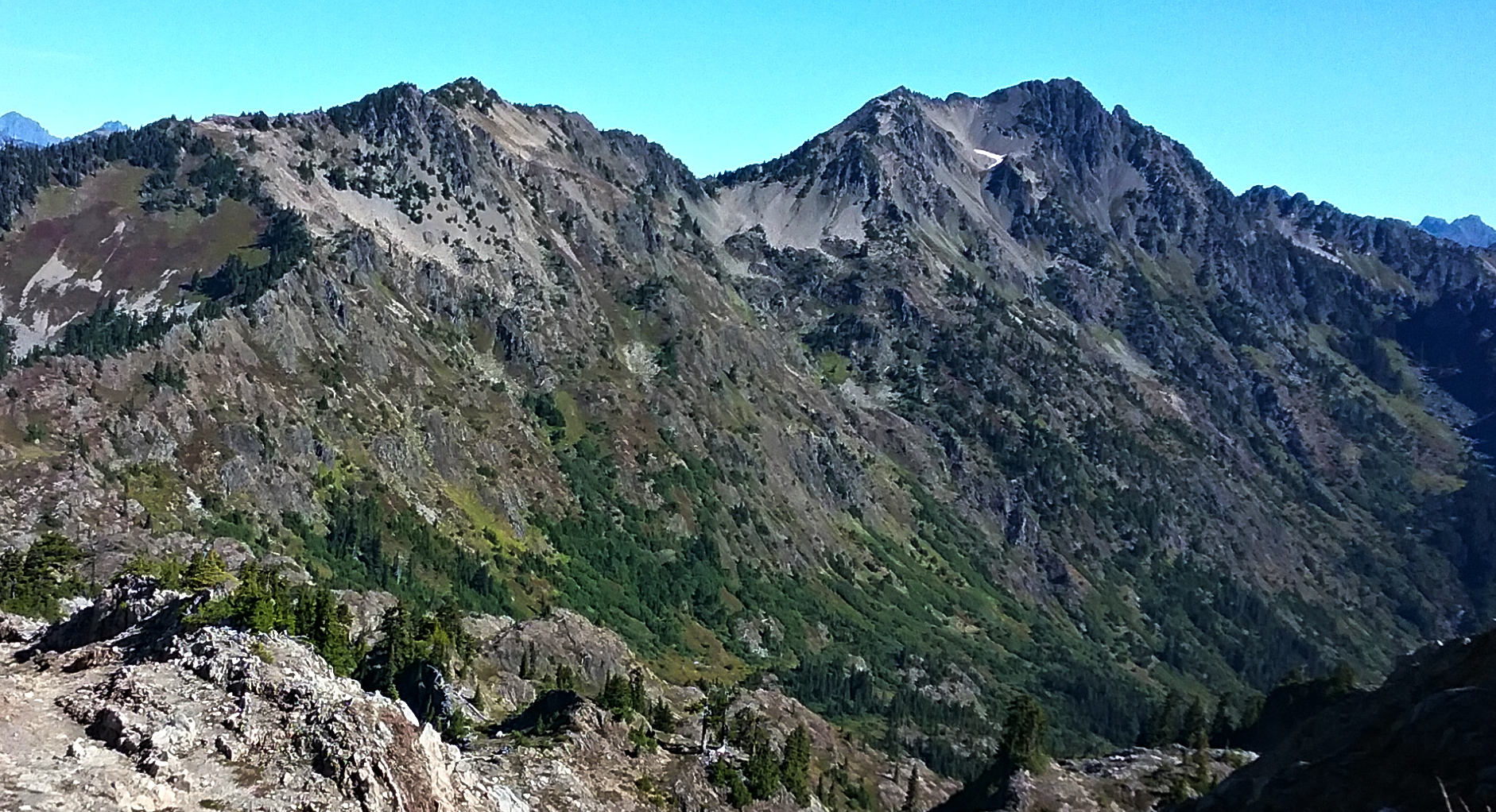
- Mt. Henderson (left) and Mt. Skokomish (right) seen from the south at Mt. Gladys

Highest point
- Elevation: 6,003 ft (1,830 m)
- Prominence: 323 ft (98 m)
- Parent peak: Mount Skokomish (6,434 ft)
- Isolation: 0.91 mi (1.46 km)
- Coordinates: 47°35′13″N 123°18′46″W

Geography
- Location within Washington (state) Location within the United States
- Country: United States
- State: Washington
- County: Mason
- Protected area: Mount Skokomish Wilderness; Olympic National Park
- Parent range: Olympic Mountains
- Topo map: USGS Mount Skokomish

Geology
- Rock age: Eocene

Climbing
- Easiest route: Hiking via Mt. Gladys

Mount Henderson is a 6,003-foot-elevation (1,830-meter) mountain summit located in the Olympic Mountains, in Mason County of Washington state, United States. It is situated on the shared boundary of Olympic National Park with Mount Skokomish Wilderness. Its nearest higher neighbor is Mount Skokomish, 0.91 mi (1.46 km) to the east-northeast. Precipitation runoff from the mountain drains into the Hamma Hamma River and Skokomish River. The mountain's toponym honors Louis Forniquet Henderson (1853-1942), a pioneering botanist and mountaineer who accompanied Lieutenant O'Neil on his 1890 expedition into the Olympic Mountains.

== Climate ==
Mount Henderson is located in the marine west coast climate zone of western North America. Weather fronts originating in the Pacific Ocean travel northeast toward the Olympic Mountains. As fronts approach, they are forced upward by the peaks (orographic lift), causing them to drop their moisture in the form of rain or snow. As a result, the Olympics experience high precipitation, especially during the winter months in the form of snowfall. Because of maritime influence, snow tends to be wet and heavy, resulting in avalanche danger. During winter months weather is usually cloudy, but due to high pressure systems over the Pacific Ocean that intensify during summer months, there is often little or no cloud cover during the summer.

== Geology ==
The Olympic Mountains are composed of obducted clastic wedge material and oceanic crust, primarily Eocene sandstone, turbidite, and basaltic oceanic crust. The mountains were sculpted during the Pleistocene era by erosion and glaciers advancing and retreating multiple times.

== See also ==
- Geology of the Pacific Northwest
- Geography of Washington (state)
