= Mount Lincoln (Washington) =

Mountain in Washington (state), United States

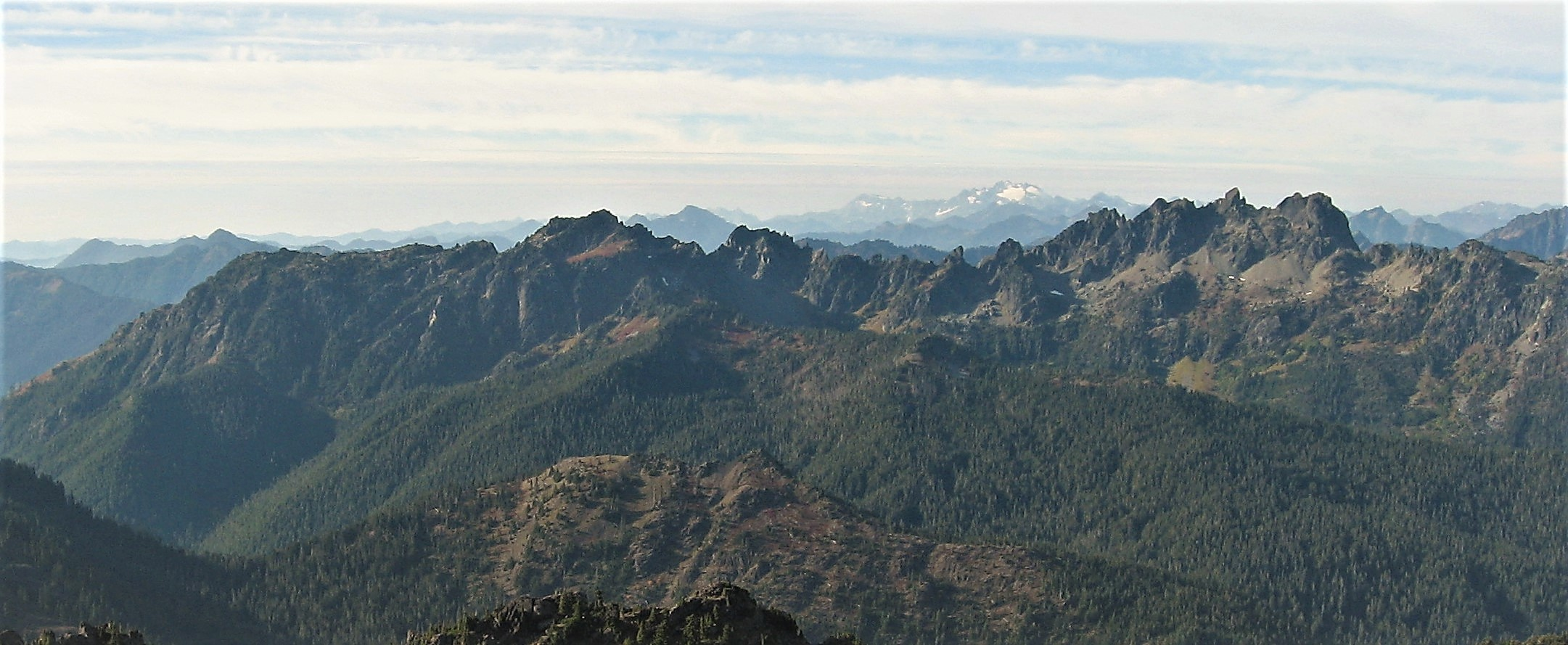
- Southeast aspect of Mt. Lincoln (left of center) (Mt. Cruiser to right. Viewed from Mt. Ellinor)

Highest point
- Elevation: 5,868 ft (1,789 m)
- Prominence: 508 ft (155 m)
- Parent peak: Mount Cruiser (6,104 ft)
- Isolation: 1.12 mi (1.80 km)
- Coordinates: 47°33′00″N 123°19′40″W

Geography
- Location within Washington (state) Location within the United States
- Country: United States
- State: Washington
- County: Mason
- Protected area: Olympic National Park; Mount Skokomish Wilderness
- Parent range: Olympic Mountains
- Topo map: USGS Mount Skokomish

Geology
- Rock age: Eocene
- Rock type: Basalt

Climbing
- First ascent: 1932 by Ken Soult, F.S. Harmon
- Easiest route: class 2 South ridge

Mount Lincoln is a 5,868-foot (1,789-meter) mountain summit located in the Olympic Mountains, in Mason County of Washington state, United States. It is situated on the boundary shared by Daniel J. Evans Wilderness and Mount Skokomish Wilderness, as well as the shared common border of Olympic National Park with Olympic National Forest. Lincoln is the second-highest point on Sawtooth Ridge, and the nearest higher neighbor is Mount Cruiser, 1.1 mi (1.8 km) to the northeast. Lincoln has two sub-peaks: a North Peak (5,690 ft; 1,730 m), and a Southwest Peak (5,486 ft; 1,672 m). Flapjack Lakes lie immediately west below the north sub-peak. Topographic relief is significant as the summit rises over 5,100 feet (1,600 m) above the Staircase Ranger Station at Lake Cushman in approximately two miles. Precipitation runoff from the mountain drains into tributaries of the North Fork Skokomish River, and partly into Mildred Lakes, thence Hamma Hamma River.

== Climate ==
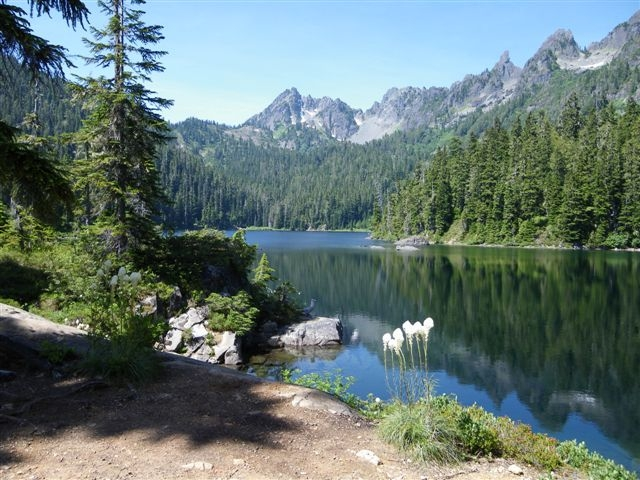
East aspect of Mt. Lincoln (centered) seen from Mildred Lakes in Olympic National Forest

Mount Lincoln is located in the marine west coast climate zone of western North America. Weather fronts originating in the Pacific Ocean travel northeast toward the Olympic Mountains. As fronts approach, they are forced upward by the peaks (orographic lift), causing them to drop their moisture in the form of rain or snow. As a result, the Olympics experience high precipitation, especially during the winter months in the form of snowfall. Because of maritime influence, snow tends to be wet and heavy, resulting in avalanche danger. During winter months weather is usually cloudy, but due to high pressure systems over the Pacific Ocean that intensify during summer months, there is often little or no cloud cover during the summer. The months May through October offer the most favorable weather for climbing or viewing.

== History ==
It is unknown who named the mountain or nearby Lincoln Creek, but it's presumed to honor President Abraham Lincoln (1809–1865), the 16th president of the United States. In 1862 during the Civil War, President Lincoln by executive order designated the nearby townsite of Port Angeles for a military and naval reserve.

The peak was probably climbed in 1890 by an exploratory party of the Second O'Neil Expedition. As the sun was setting, they reached a summit and were overwhelmed by the grandeur of the country that stretched before them. Inspired by the view, botanist Louis Henderson described the view:

"A more magnificent scene had never presented itself to my eyes, and I doubt whether anything in the higher Alps or the grand ice-mountains of Alaska could outrival that view... Canyon mingled with canyon, peak rose above peak, ridge succeeded ridge, until they culminated in old Olympus far to the northwest; snow, west, north and south; the fast descending sun bringing out the gorgeous colors of pale-blue, lavender, purple, ash, pink and gold. Add to this the delightful warmth of a summer sun in these altitudes — the awful stillness broken every now and then by the no less awful thunder of some distant avalanche — a fearful precipice just before us down which a single step in advance would hurl us hundreds of feet and one can form some slight idea of the reasons that compelled us to gaze and be silent."

The first documented ascent of the summit was made in 1932 by Ken Soult and F.S. Harmon.

== Climbing routes ==
Established scrambling routes on Mt. Lincoln:

- via the south ridge – class 2
- via Flapjack Lake and north ridge – class 3
- via Harniss Chute – class 3

== Geology ==
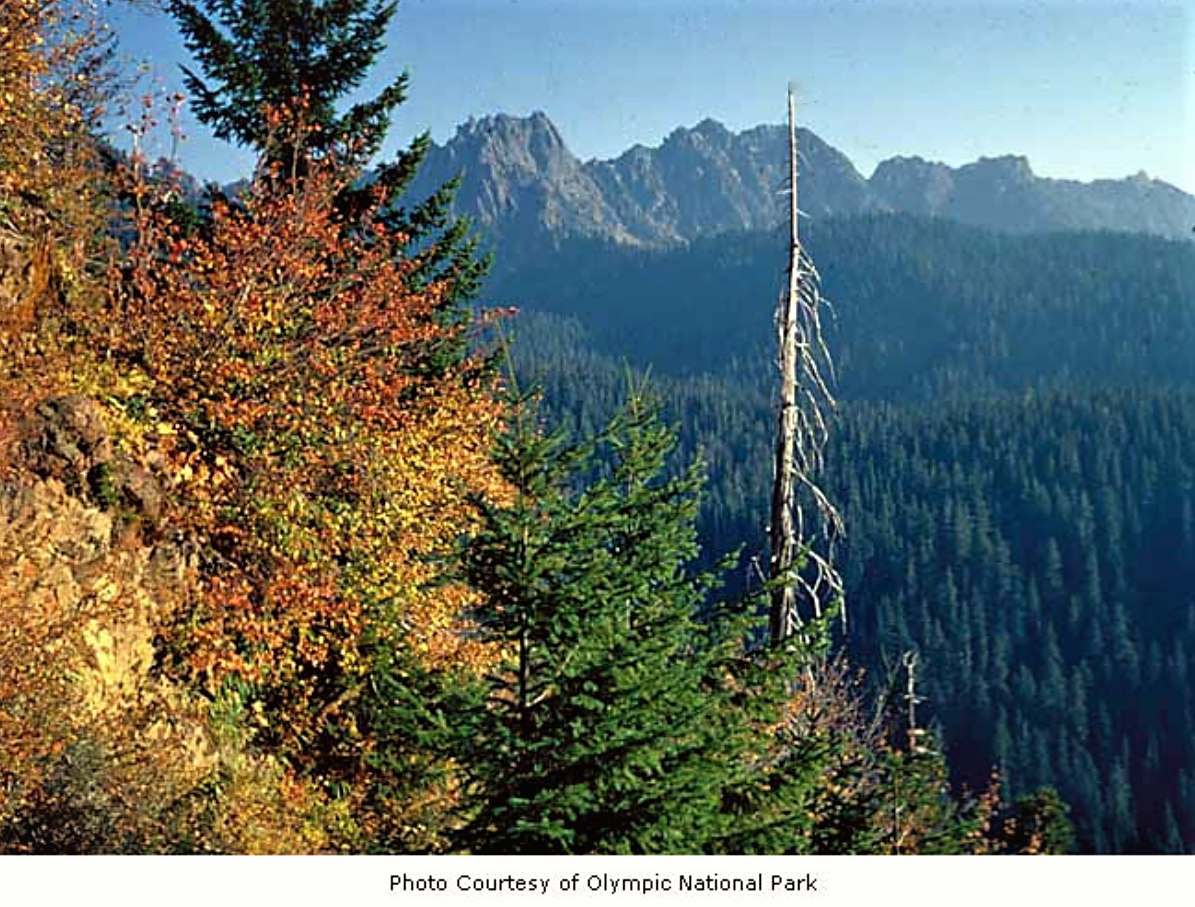
Mount Lincoln

The Olympic Mountains are composed of obducted clastic wedge material and oceanic crust, primarily Eocene sandstone, turbidite, and basaltic oceanic crust. The mountains were sculpted during the Pleistocene era by erosion and glaciers advancing and retreating multiple times.

== See also ==
- Geology of the Pacific Northwest
- Olympic Mountains
