= Mount Ellinor =

Mountain in Washington (state), United States

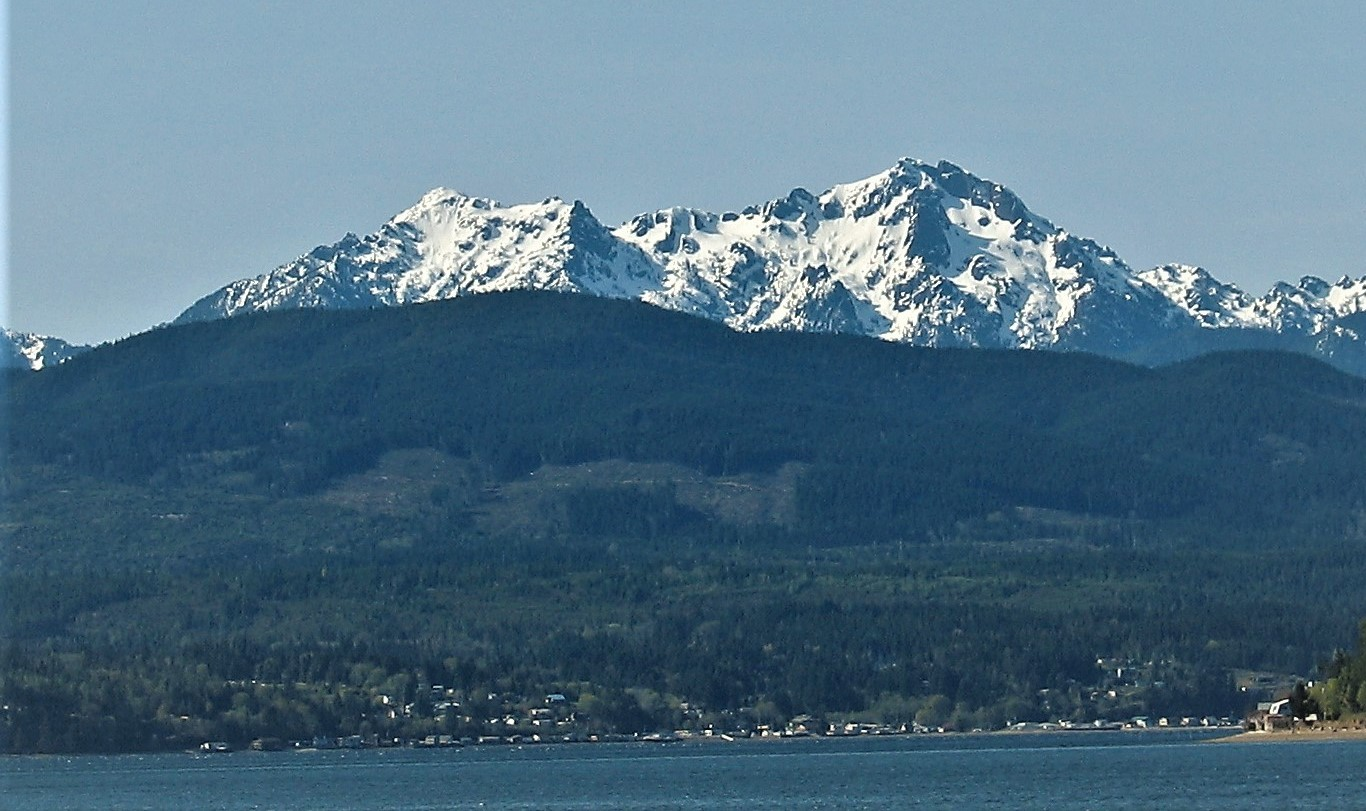
- Mt. Ellinor (left) and Mt. Washington; View from southeast along Hood Canal

Highest point
- Elevation: 5,952 ft (1,814 m) NAVD 88
- Prominence: 440 ft (130 m)
- Coordinates: 47°31′18″N 123°15′38″W

Geography
- Location within Washington (state)
- Location: Mason County, Washington, U.S.
- Parent range: Olympic Mountains
- Topo map: USGS Mount Skokomish

Mount Ellinor is a peak in the Olympic Mountains of Washington, United States. It is located in an area designated as the Mount Skokomish Wilderness. The mountain is a popular day hike in the summer months; the summit is reachable via a steep-but-brief 3.3-mile (5.3 km) trail which gains about 3,200 feet (980 m) in elevation from the lower trailhead.

There are two trailheads, both of which are accessed from National Forest Road 24 north of Lake Cushman. This lower trailhead lies at an elevation of 2,666 feet (813 m), and the upper trailhead at about 3,400 feet (1,000 m); a Northwest Forest Pass is required to park at the upper trailhead.

== History ==
In 1853, surveyor George Davidson named the mountain after Ellinor Fauntleroy, his fiancé. Additionally, Davidson named The Brothers after Ellinor's two brothers, and Mount Constance after her older sister.

The first American settlers to climb Mount Ellinor were D.N. Utler, Mr. and Mrs. J.W. Waughop, and H.C. Esteps, in August 1879.

== View ==
Mount Ellinor offers a variety of views of all the major Cascade peaks, as well as close-range views of neighboring Mount Washington, Stone, Pershing, and a glimpse of Mount Olympus in the distance. Additionally, views of Lake Cushman, the Hood Canal and the Puget Sound abound.

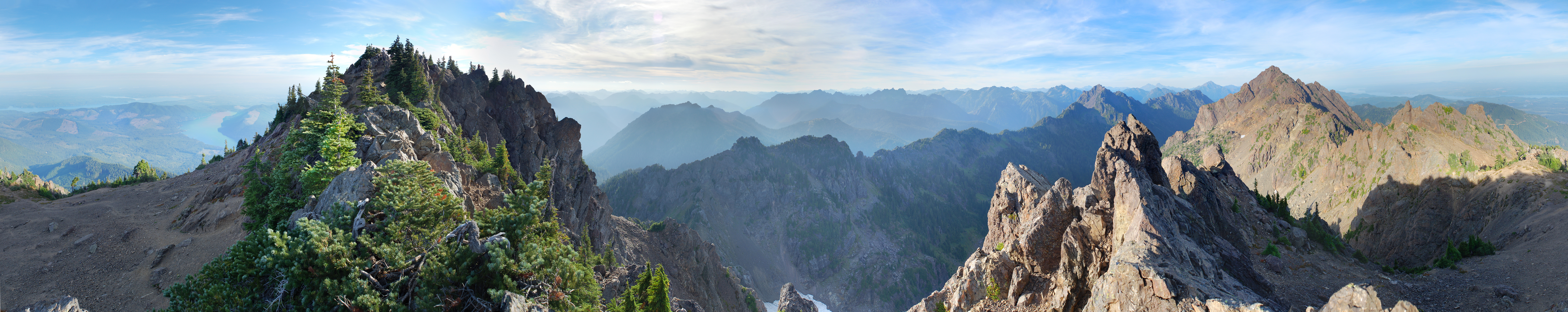
360° panorama from near the summit of Mount Ellinor in the Olympic Mountains of Washington state. Mount Washington is on the right
