= Mount Skokomish Wilderness =

Wilderness area in Washington, United States

- IUCN category Ib (wilderness area)
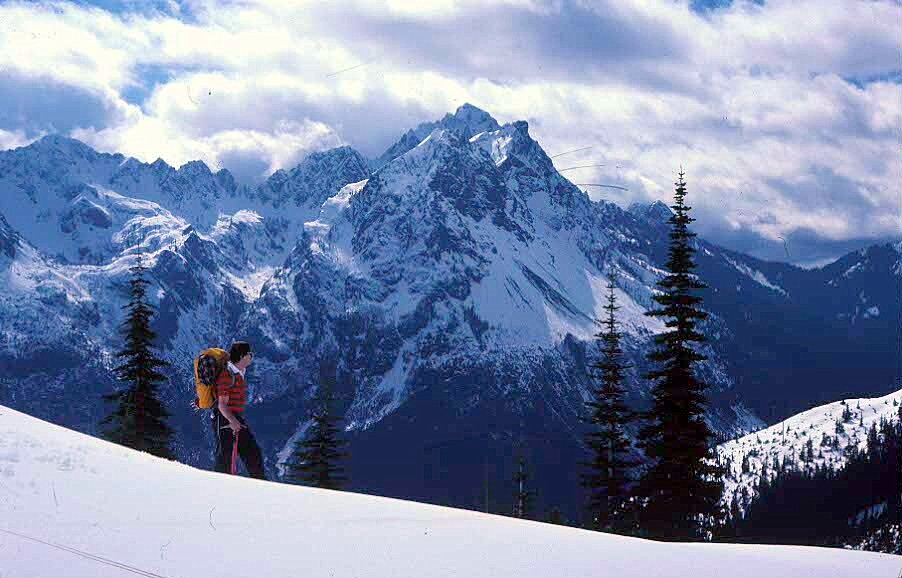
- Snowshoer in Mount Skokomish Wilderness, Mount Pershing in the background

- Location within the United States
- Location: Mason County, Washington, USA
- Nearest city: Lilliwaup, Washington
- Coordinates: 47°33′10″N 123°15′01″W
- Area: 13,291 acres (5,379 ha)
- Established: 1984
- Governing body: U.S. Forest Service
- Website: Mount Skokomish Wilderness

Mount Skokomish Wilderness is a designated wilderness area in the southeast portion of Olympic National Forest on the Olympic Peninsula of Washington in the United States. The wilderness area comprises 13,291 acres (5,379 ha) administered by the U.S. Forest Service.

== History ==
In 1984, the U.S. Congress established five wilderness areas within Olympic National Forest:

- Buckhorn Wilderness
- Colonel Bob Wilderness
- Mount Skokomish Wilderness
- The Brothers Wilderness
- Wonder Mountain Wilderness

Mount Skokomish Wilderness sits along the southeast flank of the Olympic Wilderness, which was created in 1988.

== Topography ==
Mount Skokomish Wilderness is located in the southeast corner of Olympic National Forest, just north of Lake Cushman. It consists of two long rocky ridges running roughly northeast to southwest. Elevations range from about 2,000 feet (609.6 m) to 6,434 feet (1,961.1 m) at the peak of Mount Skokomish on the northwest boundary. The northern ridge rises to Mounts Skokomish, Lincoln, and Cruiser, with Sawtooth Ridge, a popular rock-climbing location, stretching between Lincoln and Cruiser. The southern ridge includes the summits of Mounts Pershing, Washington, Rose, Ellinor, Jefferson Peak, and Tran Spire. Between the ridges lies the headwaters basin of the Hamma Hamma River, which gathers its waters from Mildred Lakes and tributary streams in the western portion to flow east across the Wilderness.

== Vegetation ==
Common vegetation in Mount Skokomish Wilderness include old-growth western hemlock, western red cedar, and Douglas fir in the lower elevations. Higher elevations display various species of firs, pines, and dwarf juniper.

== Wildlife ==
Common wildlife found in Mount Skokomish Wilderness include elk, black-tailed deer, black bear, mountain lion, marmot, and mountain goat.

== Recreation ==
Common recreational activities in Mount Skokomish Wilderness include backpacking, mountain climbing, fishing, and camping. There are over 13 miles (20.9 km) of trail inside the wilderness. The Mildred Lakes Trail is a primitive trail that has extremely steep pitches and is the major access into the Wilderness. The elevation gain on this trail is 2,100 feet and it is 4.5 miles in length. The Mt. Rose Trail, 4.8 miles, provides steep access to the summit of Mt. Rose at the southern end of the Wilderness.The Putvin Trail, 3.0 miles, accesses the north portion of the Wilderness and is also very steep.

== See also ==
- List of U.S. Wilderness Areas
- List of old growth forests
