= Mount Skokomish =

Mountain in Washington (state), United States

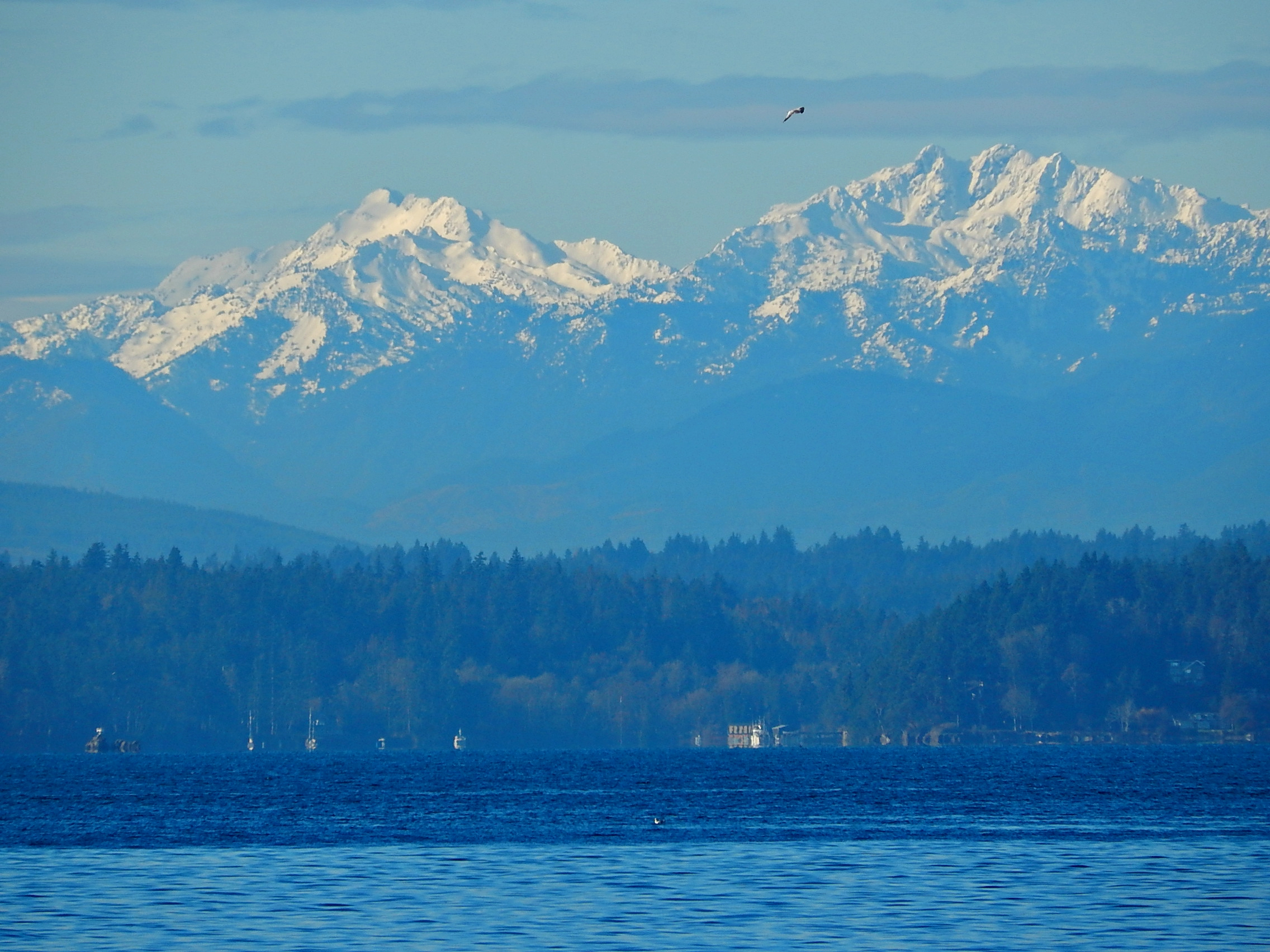
- Mount Skokomish (left) and Mount Stone (right) seen from Seattle

Highest point
- Elevation: 6,434 ft (1,961 m)
- Prominence: 1,154 ft (352 m)
- Parent peak: Mount Stone (6,612 ft)
- Isolation: 1.67 mi (2.69 km)
- Coordinates: 47°35′28″N 123°17′39″W

Geography
- Location within Washington (state) Location within the United States
- Country: United States
- State: Washington
- County: Mason
- Protected area: Mount Skokomish Wilderness; Olympic National Park
- Parent range: Olympic Mountains
- Topo map: USGS Mount Skokomish

Geology
- Rock age: Eocene
- Rock type: pillow basalt

Climbing
- Easiest route: class 2 scrambling

Mount Skokomish is a 6,434-foot (1,961 meter) mountain summit located in the Olympic Mountains, in Mason County of Washington state, United States. It is situated on the shared boundary of Olympic National Park with Mount Skokomish Wilderness, and it is the highest point of the wilderness. The nearest higher peak is Mount Stone, 1.66 mi (2.67 km) to the northeast. It is visible on the Olympic skyline from as far away as Seattle. Mt. Skokomish has three summits, the south peak being the highest. Precipitation runoff drains into the Hamma Hamma River and Skokomish River. Like the river, the mountain's toponym honors the Skokomish people.

== Climate ==
Mount Skokomish is located in the marine west coast climate zone of western North America. Weather fronts originating in the Pacific Ocean travel northeast toward the Olympic Mountains. As fronts approach, they are forced upward by the peaks (orographic lift), causing them to drop their moisture in the form of rain or snow. As a result, the Olympics experience high precipitation, especially during the winter months in the form of snowfall. Because of maritime influence, snow tends to be wet and heavy, resulting in avalanche danger. During winter months weather is usually cloudy, but due to high pressure systems over the Pacific Ocean that intensify during summer months, there is often little or no cloud cover during the summer.

== Geology ==
The Olympic Mountains are composed of obducted clastic wedge material and oceanic crust, primarily Eocene sandstone, turbidite, and basaltic oceanic crust. The mountains were sculpted during the Pleistocene era by erosion and glaciers advancing and retreating multiple times.

== Gallery ==
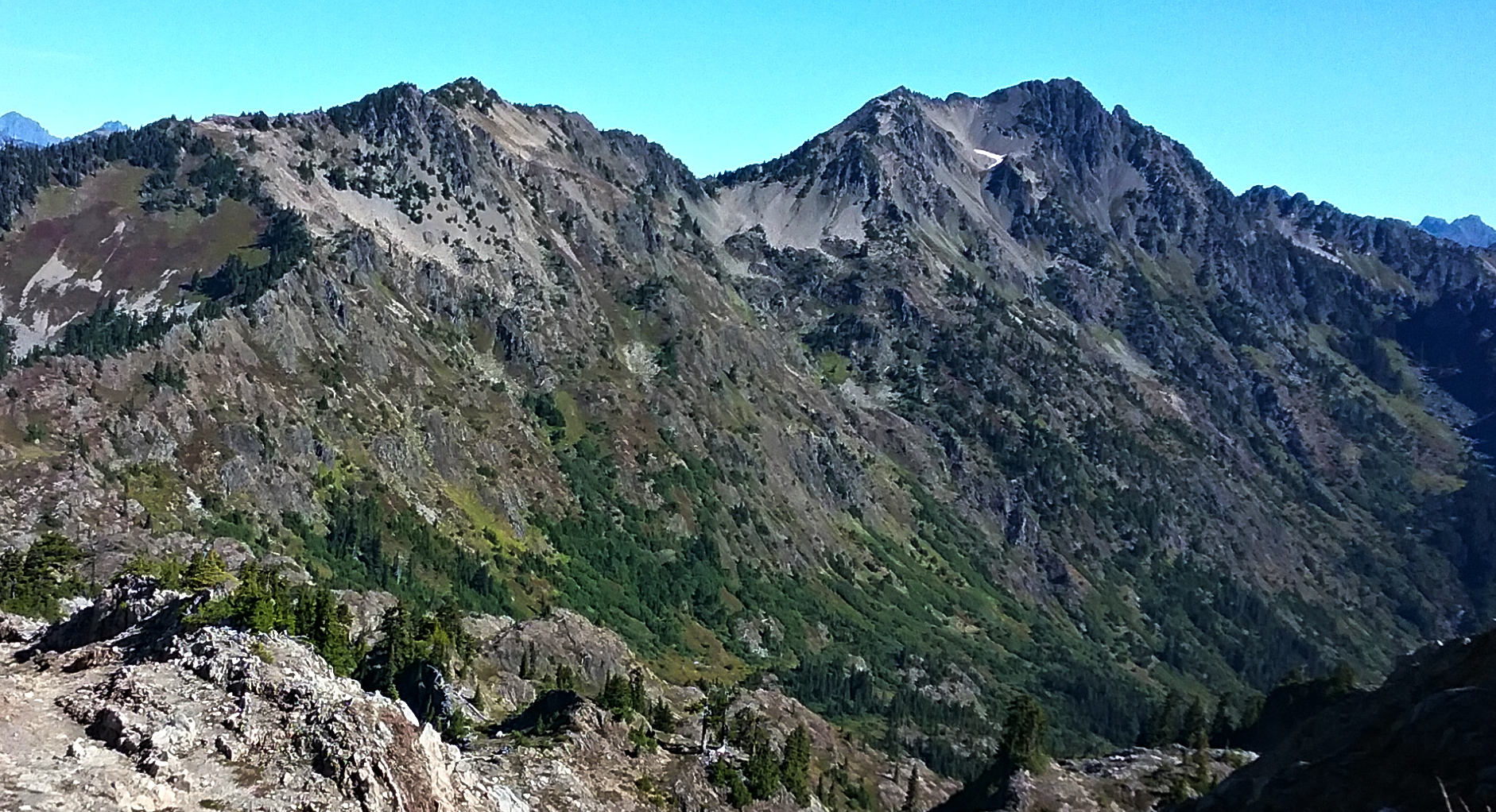
Mts. Henderson (left), Skokomish (right) from Mt. Gladys

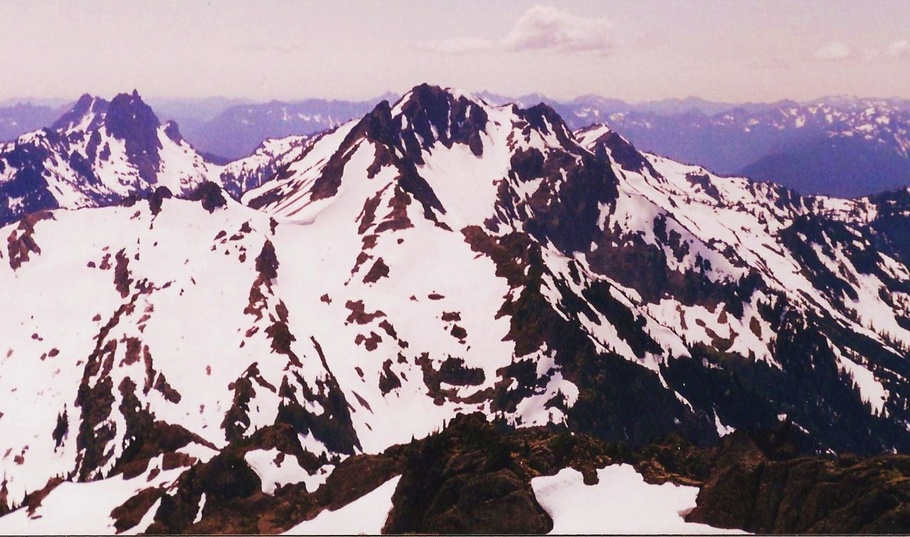
Mount Skokomish seen from Mount Stone

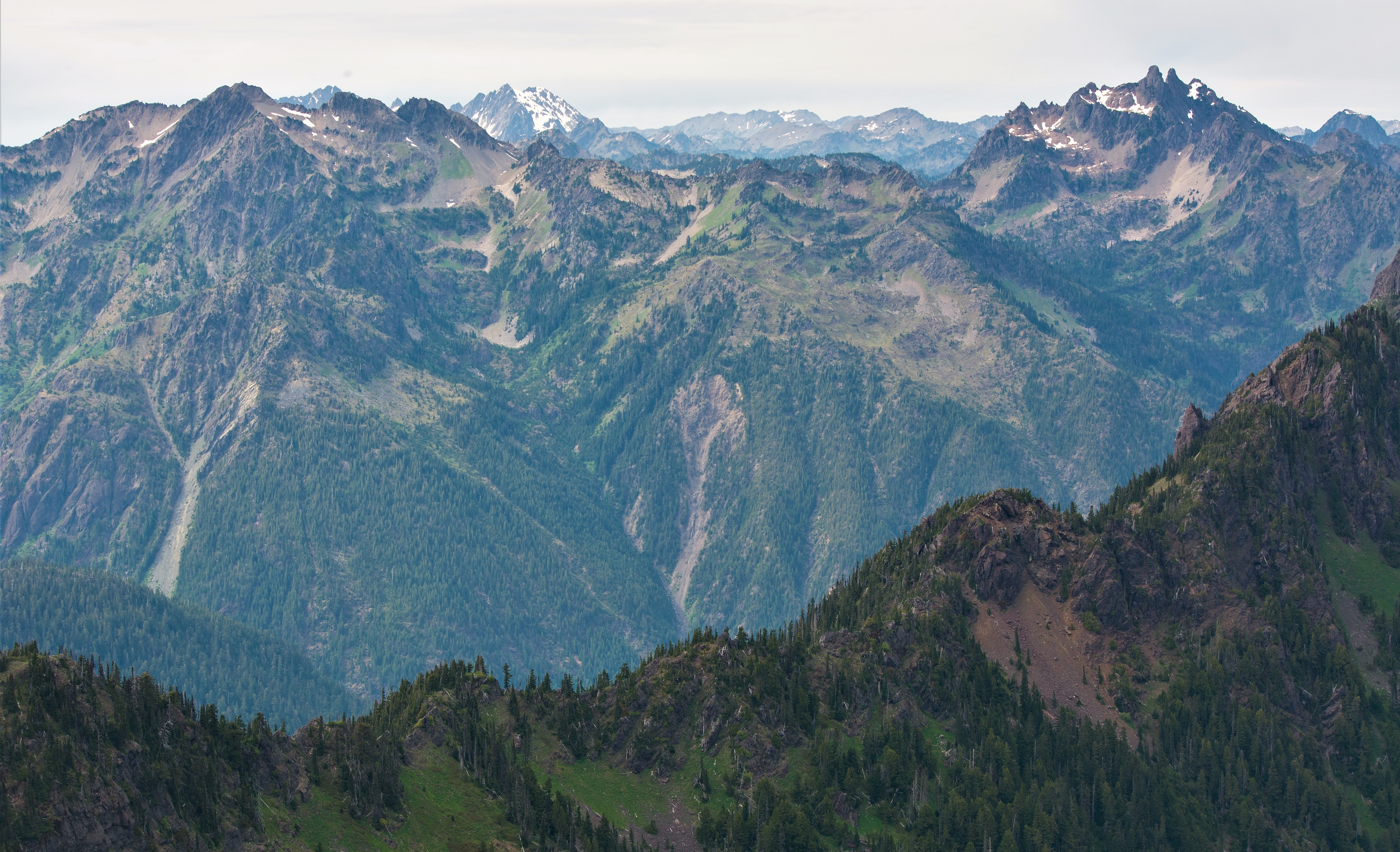
Mt. Skokomish (left) and Mt. Stone (upper right) seen from Mt. Ellinor

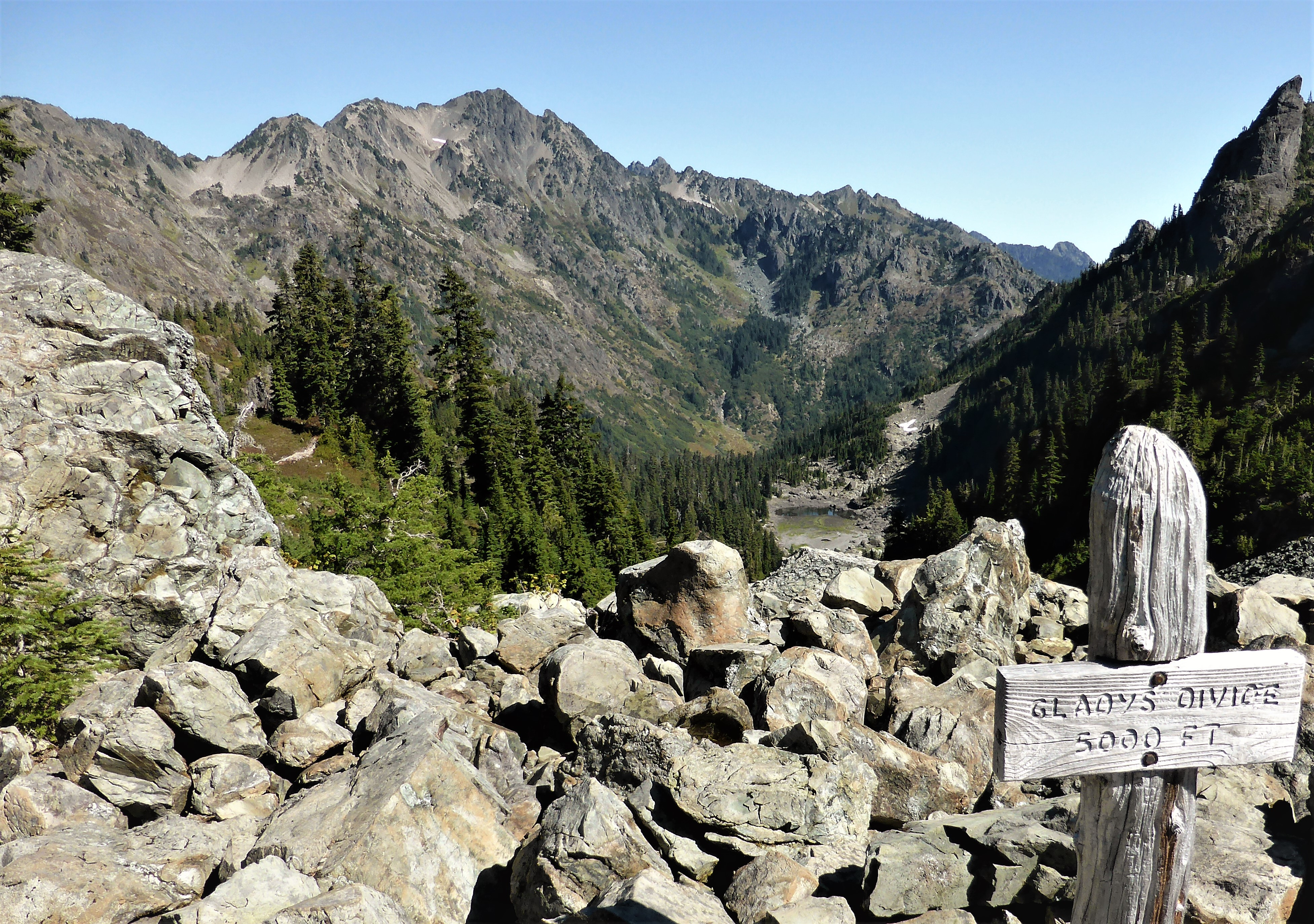
Mount Skokomish seen from Gladys Divide

== See also ==
- Geology of the Pacific Northwest
