= Mount Washington (Olympics) =

Mountain in Washington, United States

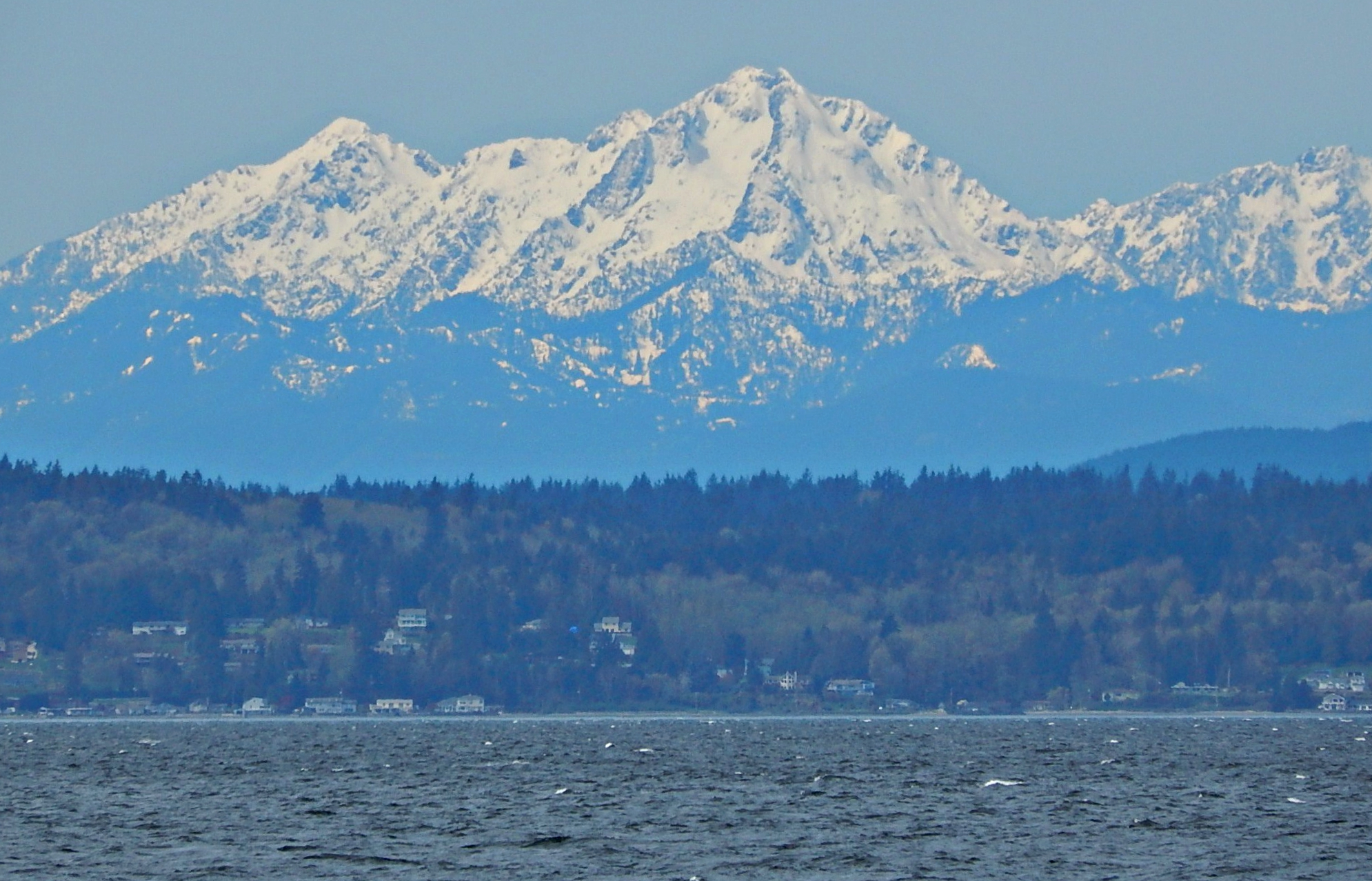
- Mount Washington seen from Seattle

Highest point
- Elevation: 6,260 ft (1,908 m)
- Prominence: 2,615 ft (797 m)
- Coordinates: 47°31′53″N 123°14′46″W

Geography
- Location within Washington (state) Location within the United States
- Location: Mason County, Washington, U.S.
- Parent range: Olympic Mountains
- Topo map: USGS Mount Washington

Climbing
- Easiest route: Route 1A from the Olympic Mountains Climbing Guide provides a direct approach with few route finding difficulties.

Mount Washington is a 6,260-foot-tall (1,910 m) peak in the Olympic Mountains of Washington state. The mountain is located in the Mount Skokomish Wilderness.

== Climate ==
Mount Washington is located in the marine west coast climate zone of western North America. Most weather fronts originate in the Pacific Ocean, and travel northeast toward the Olympic Mountains.

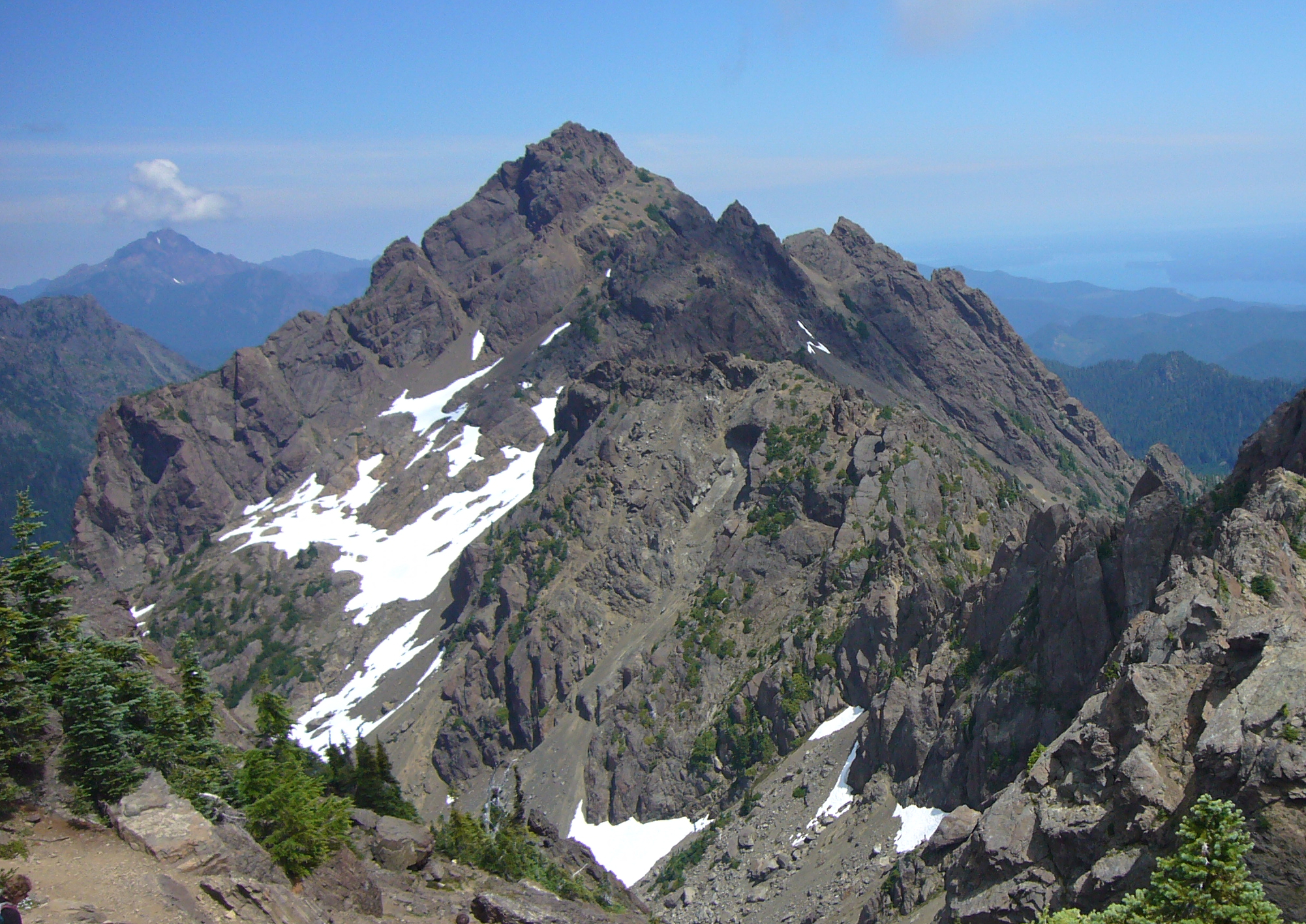
Mt. Washington seen from Mt. Ellinor

As fronts approach, they are forced upward by the peaks of the Olympic Range, causing them to drop their moisture in the form of rain or snowfall (Orographic lift). As a result, the Olympics experience high precipitation, especially during the winter months. During winter months, weather is usually cloudy, but, due to high pressure systems over the Pacific Ocean that intensify during summer months, there is often little or no cloud cover during the summer. Because of maritime influence, snow tends to be wet and heavy, resulting in avalanche danger. Precipitation runoff from the mountain drains into the Hamma Hamma River and Skokomish River.

== See also ==
- Mount Skokomish Wilderness
- Olympic Mountains
