= Lake Cushman =

Lake and reservoir in Washington, United States

- Twana: ʔiluʔəɬ
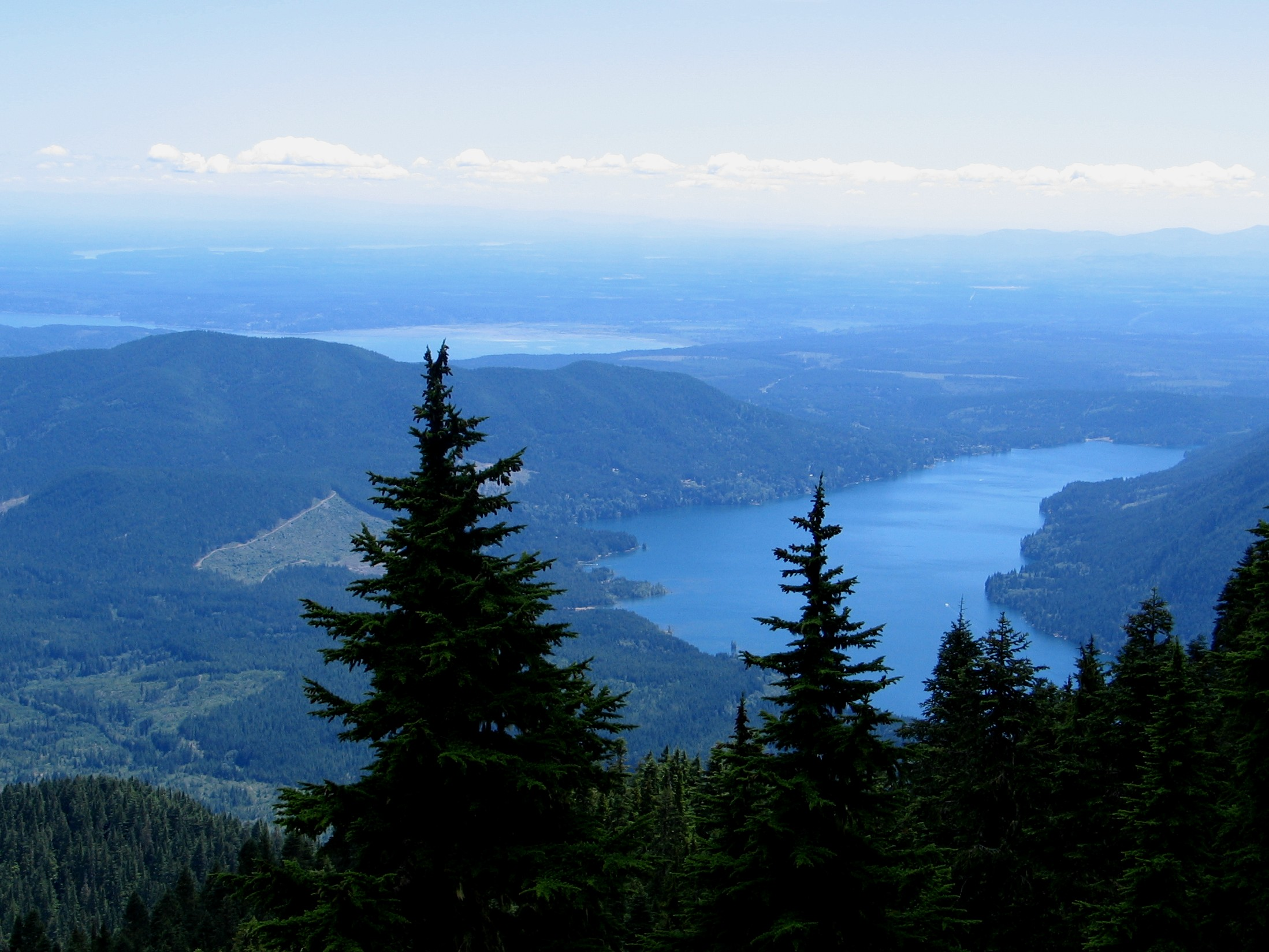
- Lake Cushman and Hood Canal, as viewed from the summit of Mt. Ellinor
- Location: Mason County, Washington
- Coordinates: 47°28′48″N 123°15′0″W
- Lake type: Reservoir
- Primary inflows: Skokomish River
- Primary outflows: Skokomish River
- Basin countries: United States
- Max. length: 8.64 mi (13.90 km)
- Max. width: 1.10 mi (1.77 km)
- Surface area: 4,014.6 acres (16.247 km^{2})
- Max. depth: 260 ft (79 m)
- Surface elevation: 739 ft (225 m)
- Settlements: Lake Cushman

Lake Cushman (Twana: ʔiluʔəɬ) is a 4,014.6-acre (16.247 km^{2}) lake and reservoir on the north fork of the Skokomish River in Mason County, Washington, United States. The lake originally was a long narrow broadening of the Skokomish River formed in a glacial trough and dammed by a terminal moraine from the Vashon Glaciation during the most recent ice age.

The lake was expanded after construction of the Cushman Dam No. 1. The lake is maintained by this dam and provides electrical power to the Tacoma Power system.

As a popular retreat for hiking, fishing, boating and kayaking, Lake Cushman's shoreline is dotted with resorts and rental cabins. The lake is notable for its beautiful crystal clear blue water and the huge round rocks surrounding it, as well as thick stands of hemlock, fir and cedar trees.

== Name ==
The Twana call Lake Cushman, as well as Mount Washington, a nearby mountain, ʔiluʔəɬ.

Lake Cushman was named in honor of Orrington Cushman, who served as interpreter for Governor Isaac Stevens during the Treaty of Point Elliott negotiations with the Indigenous peoples of Puget Sound in 1854.

== Geography ==
Lake Cushman sits at 739 feet (225 m) above sea level and its maximum depth reaches up to 260 feet (79 m). It is estimated to be around 10 miles (16 km) in length. The northern part of the lake (FS-24) is near the Staircase Entrance to Olympic National Park. The closest city is Hoodsport, located 5 miles (8.0 km) to the southeast via State Route 119. Surrounding the lake are Mount Ellinor, Mount Washington, Cub Peak, Mount Gladys, and Mount Rose. Access to Lake Cushman is limited during the winter months due to road closures and hazardous conditions. In an average winter, the lake water level drops by 30 feet (9.1 m).

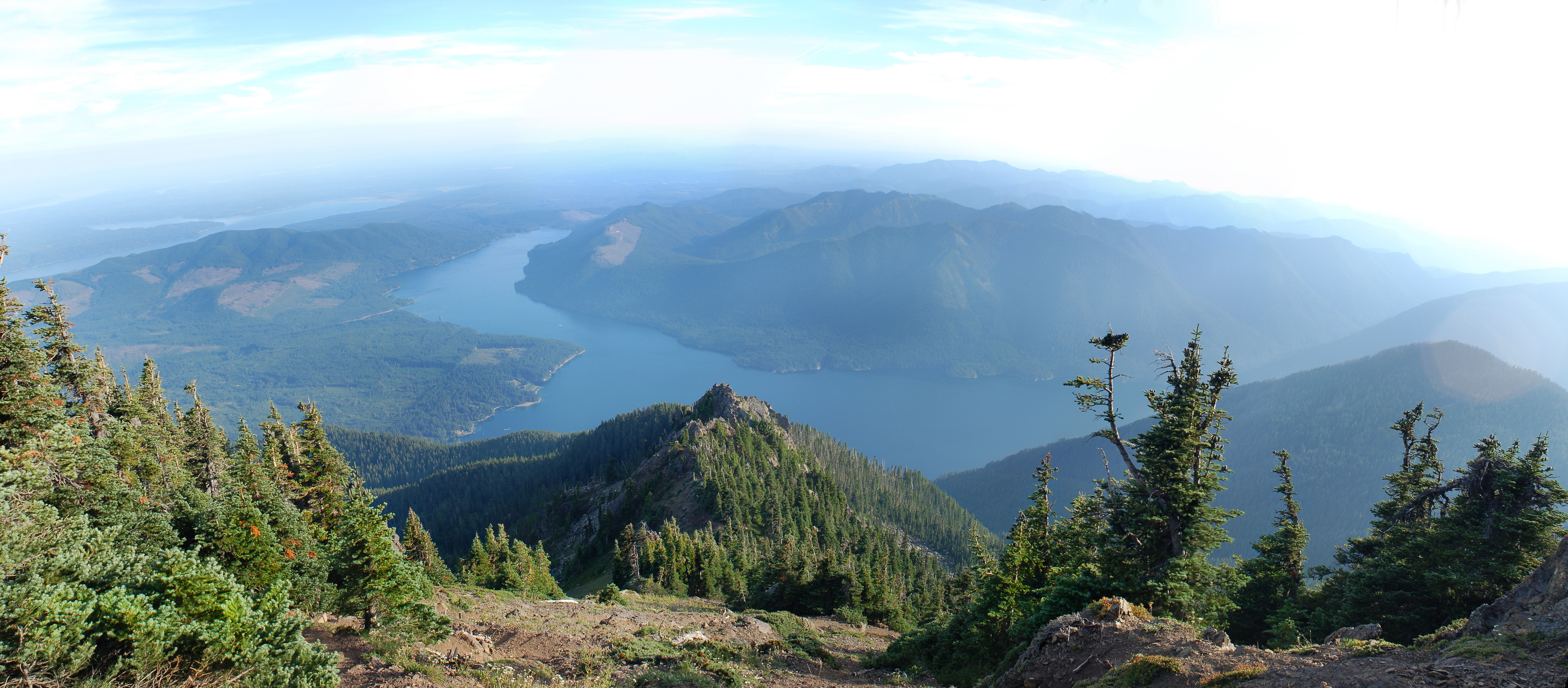
Panoramic image of Lake Cushman, 5000 feet below, as viewed from the summit of Mount Ellinor on a summer afternoon

== History ==
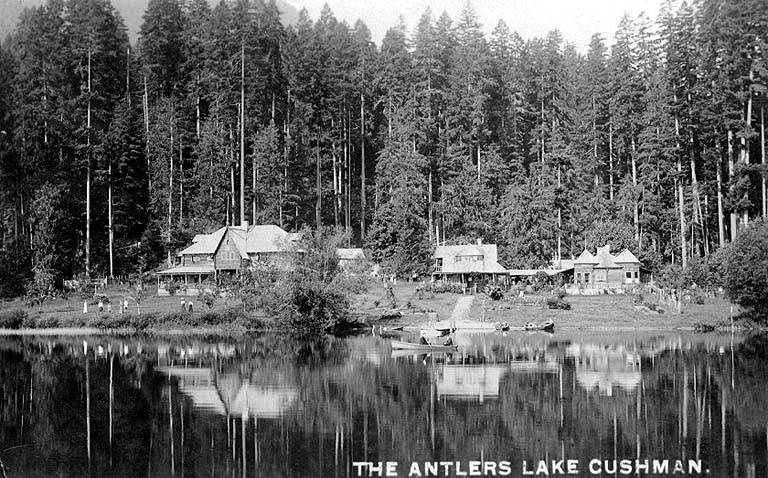
The Antlers Hotel on Lake Cushman, c. 1913

The Skokomish people, a subgroup of the Twana, have inhabited Lake Cushman and the surrounding land since time immemorial. There was a village of the Skokomish near what is now Skokomish Park, which was, prior to the construction of the dam, the furthest south extent of the lake.

In 1889, the Antlers Hotel was built on Lake Cushman by a pair of East Coast businessmen on the property of Russell Homan. It attracted tourists from the Seattle area, who would arrive at Hoodsport by steamship and continue onward to Lake Cushman via stagecoach. The two-story hotel was destroyed in 1925 after it was inundated by rising lake waters following the construction of the Cushman Dam No. 1 by the City of Tacoma. After the property was flooded, many have attempted to search for the remains of the hotel under the lake.

=== 2020 traffic jam incident ===
In August 2020, the U.S. Forest Service temporarily closed all public roads leading to Lake Cushman due to concerns of overcrowding amid the COVID-19 pandemic. A 6-mile (9.7 km) weekend traffic jam on the lake's primary two-lane, unpaved road had caused concerns about access for emergency vehicles, including an incident where one man died of drowning. The Forest Service also cited the congregation of people as being a potential vector for spreading COVID-19 and noted several fights, assaults, and other incidents.

== Recreation ==
=== Hiking ===
The Lake Cushman area offers access to multiple hiking trails on the western side of the lake:

- Big Creek Campground Trail #827
- Big Creek Trailhead
- Big Creek Upper Loop #827.1
- Copper Creek Trail #876
- Dry Creek East Trailhead
- Dry Creek Trail #872
- Jefferson Pass Trailhead
- Mt. Ellinor Connector Trail #827.2
- Mt. Ellinor Lower Trailhead
- Mt. Ellinor Trail #812
- Mt. Ellinor Upper Trailhead

The northern side of the Lake has various trails following the Skokomish River, which include:

- Staircase Trailhead
- Copper Creek Trailhead
- Shady Lane Trail head

The eastern side of the lake contains several trails within United States Forest Service Land:

- Jacob's Peak Trail
- Lake Cushman Park Trail

=== Fishing ===
Lake Cushman has year-round open season fishing and is stocked with Kokanee salmon and Cutthroat trout. Besides officially stocked fish, the lake also contains various species of trout, bass, sculpins, and salmon. Skokomish Park is fitted with a boat ramp with three paved ramps that allows access to the lake for a small day-use fee. Boat rentals are also available at the park.

=== Swimming and watersports ===
Swimming, boating, kayaking and cliff jumping are also among the most popular activities for Lake Cushman visitors. Public access to the lake is available at Skokomish Park and Lake Cushman Resort.

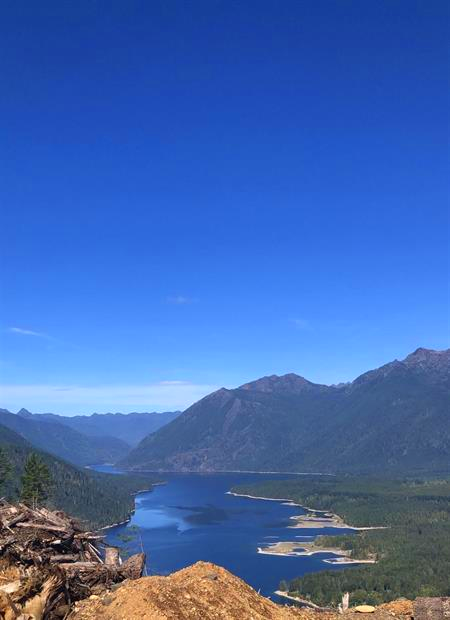
View of Lake Cushman looking northwest

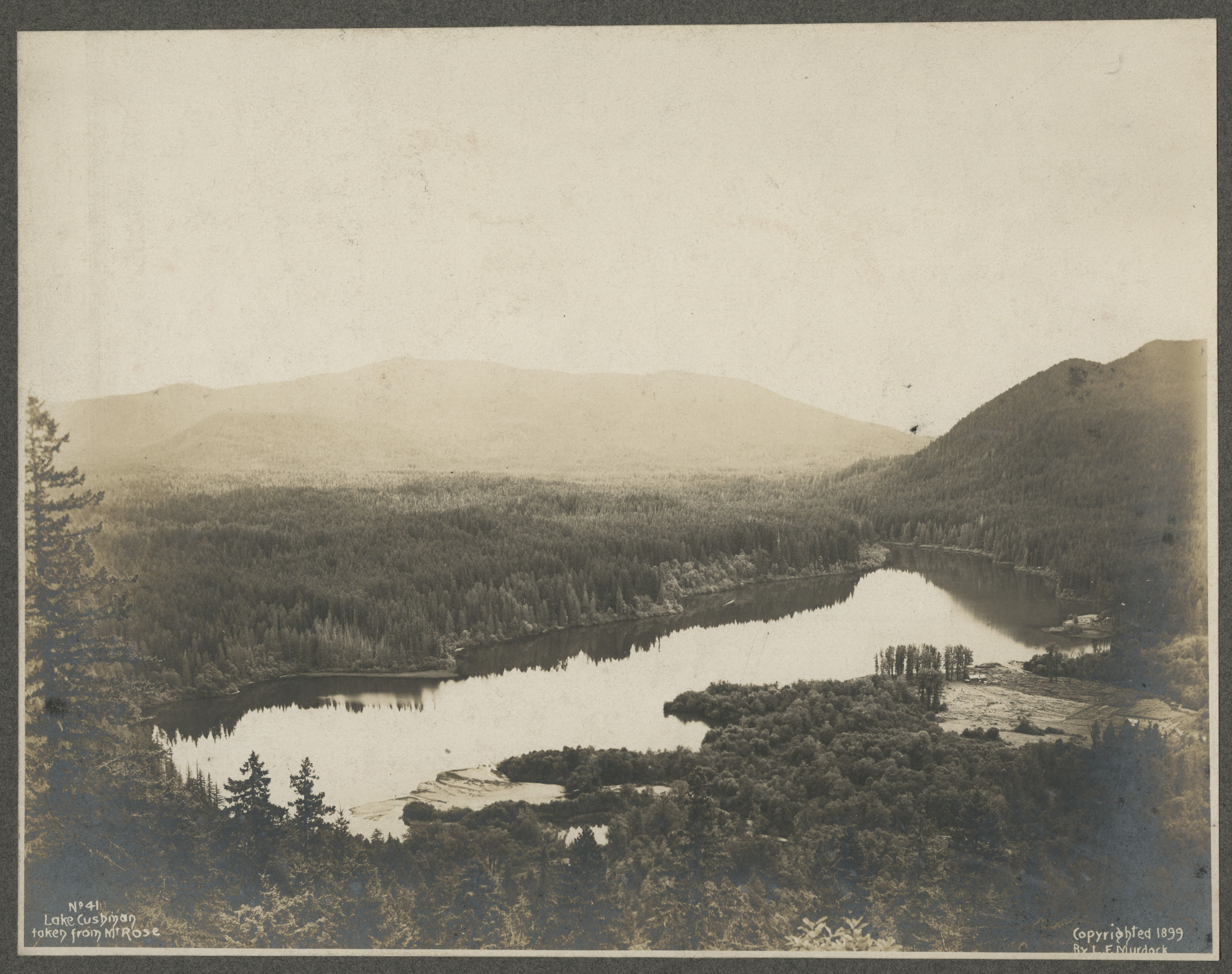
Lake Cushman from Mt. Rose, 1899

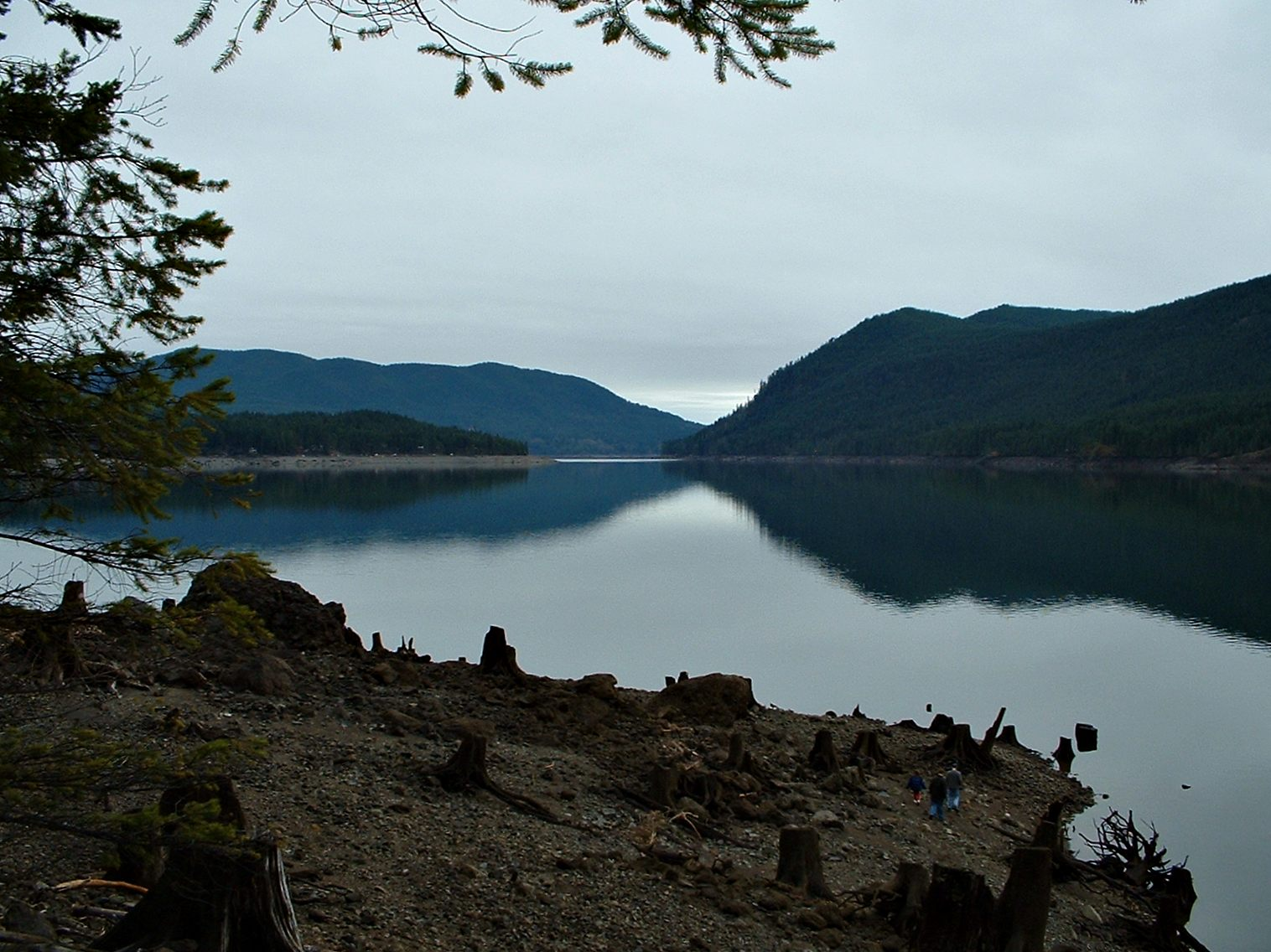
Lake Cushman with stumps showing changing water levels

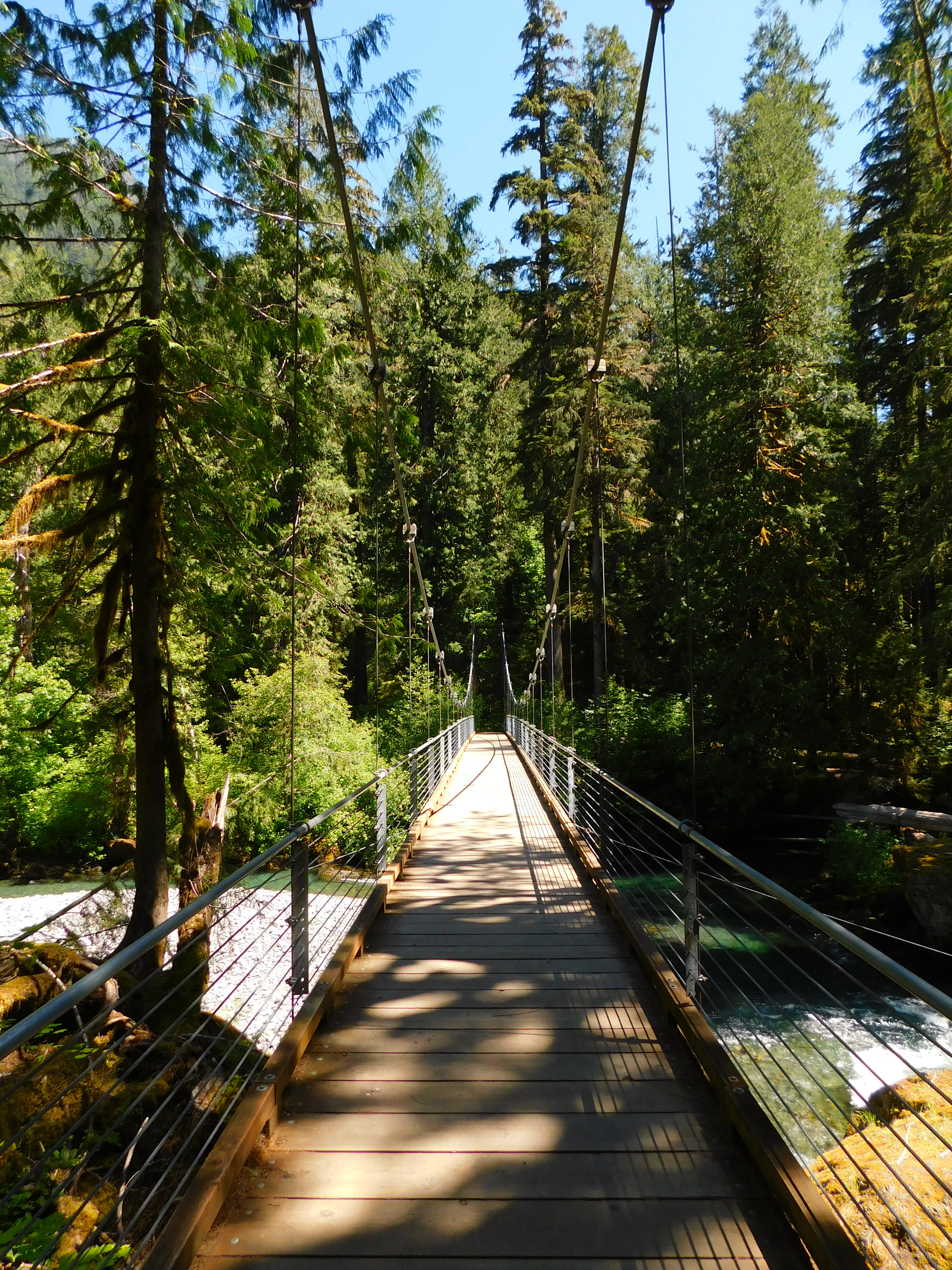
Skokimish River Suspension Bridge at Staircase, 2024

== Lodging ==
The Skokomish Park campground is a former state park that was sold to private operators in 2002. The campground includes tent and RV campsites, group campsites and picnic areas. Further away from the lake are Big Creek Campground in Olympic National Forest and Staircase Campground in Olympic National Park. Big Creek offers tent sites and RV parking, and is situated 8 miles (13 km) from the lake. Staircase is 1 mile (1.6 km) from Lake Cushman and offers 47 camping sites.

The Lake Cushman Resort was permanently closed in 2018 due to the expiration of its 50-year lease with Tacoma Public Utilities.
