= Skokomish =

Skokomish can refer to:

== People ==
- Skokomish people, an indigenous people of the Pacific Northwest Coast
- Skokomish Indian Tribe, a federally recognized tribe of the Skokomish people
- Sko-ko-mish is an archaic rendering of Sḵwxwú7mesh, the indigenous name of the Squamish people of British Columbia.

== Places ==
- Lake Skokomish was a Proglacial lake in Washington state.
- Skokomish, Washington, a census-designated place in Mason County, Washington
- Skokomish Indian Reservation in Mason County, Washington
- Skokomish River
- Mount Skokomish

== Other ==
- Skokomish language, a dialect of the Twana language
