= Potlatch, Washington =

Unincorporated community in Washington, United States

- Unincorporated community
- Location within Washington (state) Location within the United States
- Coordinates: 47°22′34″N 123°08′58″W
- Country: United States
- State: Washington
- County: Mason
- Elevation: 16 ft (4.9 m)
- Time zone: UTC-8 (Pacific (PST))
  - Summer (DST): UTC-7 (PDT)
- GNIS feature ID: 1524605

Potlatch is an unincorporated community in Mason County, Washington, United States. It is located on the western shore of the Great Bend of Hood Canal, near the mouth of the Skokomish River.

== History ==
The town was named for the Chinook Jargon word potlatch, meaning 'to give,' as well as in reference to the potlatch gift-giving ceremony of the Pacific Northwest indigenous groups. The town was so-named for the presence of a former Skokomish potlatch house. The town's European history dates to 1900, when Thomas Bordeaux became president of the newly incorporated Potlatch Commercial and Terminal Company. The company acquired timber lands and began construction of a logging railway to access them. Potlatch was built as a company town. The hydroelectric dam at Lake Cushman and the Potlatch Powerhouse began producing electricity in 1926. The second dam at Lake Kokanee was finished in 1930. The water is conveyed to Potlatch through huge pipes, visible for miles.

Potlatch borders lands of the Skokomish Indian Tribe to the south. During shrimp, crab, and salmon harvesting seasons, tribal fishing operations sell their fresh catch.

== Infrastructure ==
The Cushman Dam No. 2 powerhouse, which generates hydropower electricity for Tacoma, is located in Potlatch. Water from Lake Kokanee on the North Fork Skokomish River is piped to the powerhouse at Potlatch. Nearly the entire flow of the river was diverted to the Potlatch Powerhouse. A 2009 settlement will result in more water from the Cushman Hydro Project, which includes Cushman Dam No. 1 at Lake Cushman, and Dam No. 2 at Lake Kokanee, being released into the lower North Fork Skokomish River.

== Parks and recreation ==
Potlatch State Park is south of the town center.
