= Twana =

Indigenous group in North America

təwəʔduq
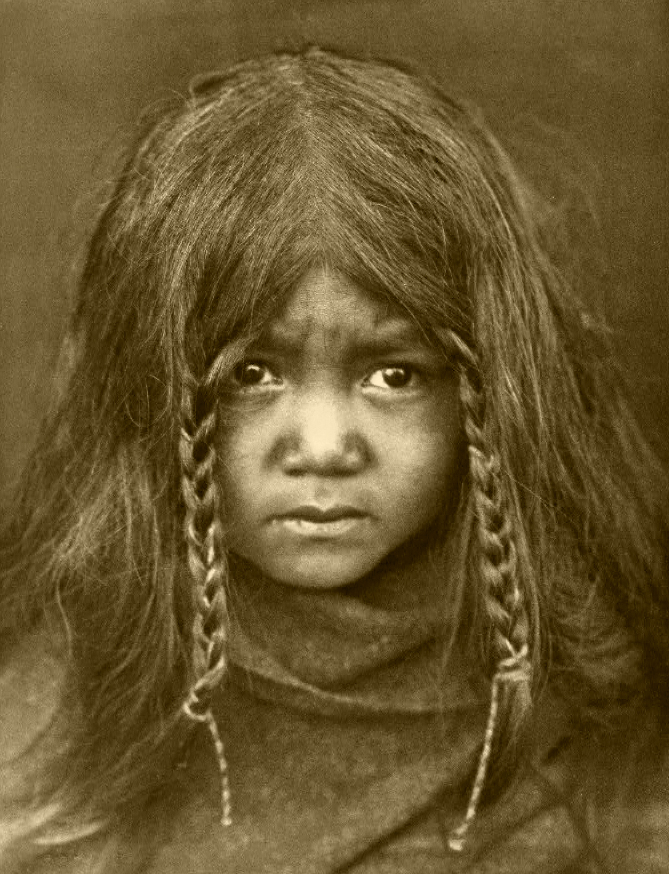
- Portrait of a Quilcene boy, c. 1913

Total population
- 796

Regions with significant populations
- Hood Canal, Washington

Languages
- Twana, English

Religion
- Traditional tribal religion, Christianity, incl. syncretic forms

Related ethnic groups
- Other Coast Salish peoples

Twana (Twana: təwəʔduq) is the collective name for a group of nine Coast Salish peoples in the western Puget Sound region along much of Hood Canal. The Skokomish are the main surviving group and self-identify as the Twana today. The spoken language, also named Twana, is part of the Central Coast Salish language group. The Twana language is closely related to Lushootseed.

The nine groups making up the Twana are the Dabop, Quilcene, Dosewallips, Duckabush, Hoodsport, Skokomish, Vance Creek, Tahuya, and Duhlelap. By 1860 there were 33 settlements in total, with the Skokomish making up the majority of the population. Most descendants of all groups now are citizens of the Skokomish Indian Tribe and live on the Skokomish Indian Reservation at Skokomish, Washington, in Mason County on the Kitsap Peninsula.

== History ==
Ancestral origins of the Twana include the Proto-Salish people of the northwest Americas who migrated into Washington and developed into 23 distinct tribes, each speaking its own language. European-American contact with the Twana likely began around 1788 when traders participating in the Maritime Fur Trade came looking for sea otter pelts in the Pacific Northwest. The trade was so extensive that the sea otter population was almost diminished by 1792. There was subsequently little non-native contact in the region for about 30 years.

The Twana, along with dozens of nearby tribes, were forced into ceding their land by a series of treaties with the United States, starting with the Oregon Treaty (1846) and later the Washington Territory (1853). White settlers began moving onto the lands alongside the Twana and other tribes for a short period of time.

In 1855 the US enacted the Treaty of Point No Point, which required all Native Americans in the area to migrate from their lands and into reservations within one year after it was passed.

== Divisions ==
The 9 groups who make up the Twana were historically completely autonomous and independent. The Twana were bound by no higher political power, but only by shared language, location, and cultural practices. While the area in the immediate vicinity of a group's village would be exclusive use, the vast majority of land was used freely by all Twana groups.

Twana Name	English name	Meaning	Village location(s)
čttaʔbuxʷ	Dabob	Long Spit people	Long Spit (tabuxʷ), at the head of Dabob Bay
sqʷul̕sidəbəš	Quilcene	People of the saltwater	The mouth of Donovan Creek (qʷul̕sid)
čtduswaylupš	Dosewallips	Dosewallips River people	The mouth of the Dosewallips River (duswaylupš)
čtduxʷyabus	Duckabush	Duckabush River people	The mouth of the Duckabush River (duxʷyabus)
čtslal̕aɬlaɬtəbəxʷ	Hoodsport	Slahal-country people	The mouth of Finch Creek (slal̕aɬlaɬtəbəxʷ)
squqəʔbəš	Skokomish	People of the river	1. The confluence of the forks of the Skokomish River (yəlal̕qu); 2. The mouth of McTaggert Creek (x̌c̓ay̓ay); 3. A flat on the Skokomish River between villages 2 and 4, called č̓əlaxʷcəd 4. Below the falls at Lake Kokanee (č̓uq̓ʷaɬəɬ); 5. The former lower end of Lake Cushman (ʔiluʔəɬ)
čtq̓ʷəlq̓ʷili	Vance Creek	Cedar trees people	Up Vance Creek (q̓ʷəlq̓ʷili) at the prairies
čttax̌uya	Tahuya		The mouth of Tahuya Bay (tax̌uya)
čxʷlələp	Duhlelap	People at the far end of the canal	The mouth of Mission Creek (duxʷk̓uk̓ʷabš) at Belfair State Park

== Society ==
=== Pre-contact and reservation era ===
Native Americans of the Coast Salish region resided in semi-permanent villages. They usually moved between summer and winter locations over the course of the year in accordance with fishing and crop seasons. The people constructed permanent plank houses in winter locations. In the summer they lived in temporary tent-style dwellings. Permanent villages could include homes, sweat houses, and potlatch houses. Twana chiefs had their own speaker who delivered speeches to the villagers. There were individuals who made morning calls to wake up the village as well. Status and wealth were divided among social classes.

The Twana Tribe's primary resources were salmon (pink, coho, chum/dog, chinook, sockeye), cedar, and redwood. Other sources of food and material included herring, smelt, and shellfish. They also hunted such game as seals, sea otters, blacktail deer, black bear, elk, and fowl. They harvested plant species such as bracken, camas, and wapato. They gathered roots, berries, and nuts in the region to prepare and consume. Hides and shredded cedar bark were used to make aprons, skirts, breechclouts, shirts, leggings, robes, and moccasins.

There were likely connections within the Twana tribes as well as with other tribal groups in the southern Coast Salish region. This included trade between other Salish groups, especially with those more inland for items that could not be found at the coast. Some items from the east included mountain goat hair and hemp fiber. Canoes were sourced from the western outer coast tribes. Fishing and hunting grounds could be shared among groups. Twana were not known to partake in violent conflict; however shamans had the ability to harm other groups if needed. Coast Salish conflict was generally defensive in nature.

Men and women had different roles within the Twana village. Wood carving was a primary craft practiced by men. Woodwork included planks, houses, canoes, utensils, and containers such as bent-corner boxes. Similarly, men carved bone, stone, and antler. Wealthy and high-status men included chiefs and potlatch sponsors.

Women's roles included gathering roots, berries, and nuts. In crafts, they wove baskets, cordage, mats, and blankets. Materials for such crafts included shredded cedar bark, sedge, cattail leaves. Twana women were to isolate during their menstrual periods, the first of which signaled a woman's eligibility for marriage. Marriage was arranged by families and could be between members of different villages. Women were known to decorated with chin and leg tattoos.

==== Customs and ceremonies ====
The Twana believed that heart and life souls occupy each person. Losses of these are associated with illness and death, respectively. Deities include the sun and earth. Shamans held power to cause or cure illness, restore lost souls, and even cause death. Illness held certain significance among Twana culture. Illness could be a signal of soul loss or possession of a spirit. Young aspiring shamans, inheriting the shamanistic spirit or acquiring it through quests, became ill once the spirit possessed their body.

The concept of the circle is also of deep importance within Twana culture, including among modern-day Twana. The cyclical nature of the circle is connected to many aspects of Twana life, such as the seasons, the moon and sun, and the horizons. At gatherings, typically group members sit in a circle.

Ceremonies included the winter dance, soul recovery, elaborately painting boards, and Tamanawas. Potlatches were a common event among most North American Native tribes, including the Twana. Twana potlatches could be held at any time of the year but were common in the winter. The extravagant gathering was hosted or sponsored by an individual man or group of men, who were the gift-donors. Guests were invited from nearby villages and tribes, and they received the hosts' gifts, as a display of the latter's wealth and power. Such items of wealth could include woven blankets, dentalia, clamshell-disk beads, robes, pelts, bone war clubs, canoes, and slaves. Upon death, the Twana placed bodies in canoes or grave boxes, rather than burying them. This was followed by a ceremonial gathering that included a feast and giving away the deceased's belongings.

Some upper-class individuals of the Twana were members of a secret society, named after the society sprit "growling of an animal." The society held exclusive events similar to the potlatch, with an individual sponsor, feasts, and gifting. All members of the society possessed the society spirit, acquired through initiation. Members of the society were usually wealthy or upper-class, and initiation took place in adolescence. Initiation included several stages: showing the society spirit (where members ceremonially danced with duck-shaped rattles), laying down initiates (the initiates were sent into an unconscious trance after the society spirit possessed them), playing of the society spirit (members perform more dances for one or more nights), reviving the entranced initiates (the initiates, still unconscious, have blood dripped onto them and yelling society members lift them in the air a number of times until they awaken and run into the forest), ritual bathing of the initiate (initiates are bathed in a river by their parents, given ceremonial garments, fed, and taught the secret society spirit dance), and working or practicing the initiate (society members and new initiates practice the society spirit dance and novices become entranced, represented by vomiting blood).

=== Modern-day ===
Today, most of the Twana population live on the Skokomish Indian Reservation and the Chehalis Indian Reservation. On the Skokomish Reservation, Twana members hold personal naming and salmon run festivals. There is a tribal K-4 school on the Reservation. The Twana language is spoken and taught through a language project. They and several neighboring tribes also take part in a basket project, to pass on the traditional craft of basket making.

== See also ==
- Tulalip
