= Potlatch (disambiguation) =

Potlatch is a ceremony among indigenous peoples in North America.

Potlatch may also refer to:

- PotlatchDeltic Corporation (formerly Potlatch Corp.), a Fortune 1000 forest paper and paperboard producer
- Potlatch, Idaho, a town in the United States
- Potlatch River, Idaho
- Potlatch, Washington, an unincorporated community in the United States
  - Potlatch State Park, a camping shoreline park surrounding Potlatch, Washington
- Potlatch (convention), an annual science fiction convention in the Pacific Northwest
- Potlatch (album), by Redbone
- Potlatch (steamship)
- Potlatch (software), a desktop map editor created for the OpenStreetMap project
- Potlatch, a magazine published by the Letterist International from 1954 to 1957

== See also ==
- The Golden Potlatch (or Potlatch Days), a festival in Seattle, Washington State, USA held 1911–1914 and 1935–1941
- Potluck, a communal meal where guests bring dishes to share.
- Pot luck (disambiguation)
