= Slahal =

Gambling game

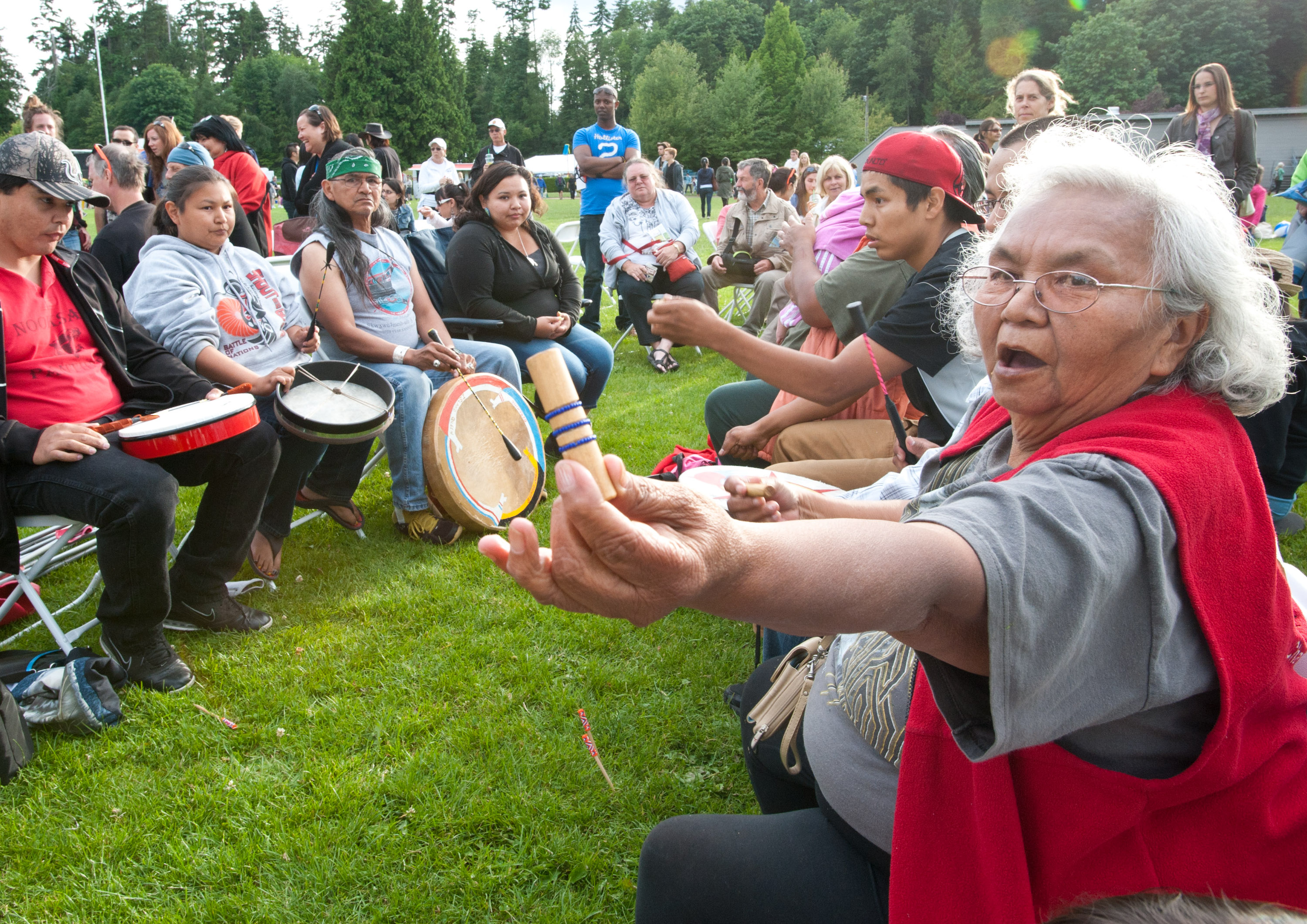
Slahal being played at Vancouver's Summer Live festival in 2011

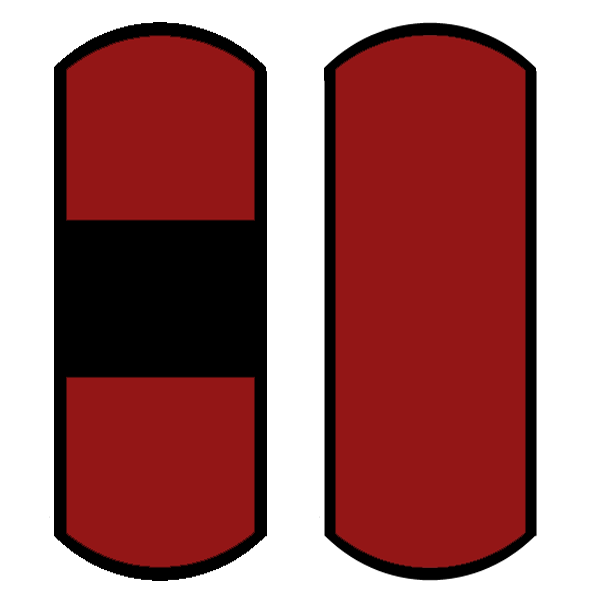
A team will play with two sets of bones, each set having one with a stripe and one without.

Slahal (also called bone game or handgame) is a gambling game played by the Coast Salish peoples in the western United States and Canada, specifically in the lower Fraser Valley area of British Columbia, parts of Vancouver Island, and north-western parts of Washington State. The game was shared in common by a number of the nations and tribal groups of this area. (Note: In the 1970s, evidence of the distribution of the game was noted amongst the following Coast Salish groups: Chehalis (the Sts'ailes, Lower Chehalis, and Upper Chehalis peoples); Chemakum, Chemainus, Chilliwack, Comox, Cowichan, Klahuse, Klallam, Lummi, Nanaimo, Nisqually, Pentlatch, Puyallup, Quileute, Quinault, Sanich, Sechelt, Skokomish, Snohomish, Snoqualmie, Songhees, Squamish, and Twana peoples.)

It is a specific version of the Native American handgame.

== Name ==
The word slahal is from a Salishan word meaning "bone game," derived from a proto-Salish word with the same meaning. The pronunciation of the name varies across different Coast Salish language, e.g.slehà:l in Halkomelem. It is also called slahal in Chinook Jargon, though with varying spellings and a synonym in the word iɬukuma, derived from a Lower Chehalis word with the same meaning. Slahal is sometimes referred to by English names, including the "bone game," the "bloodless war game," or "handgame."

== Cultural meanings ==
Slahal is not only a gambling game but also a means of social and supernatural expression. It has similar rules across different Coast Salish groups, historically providing a shared medium for interaction and peaceful rivalry.

Slahal remains of continued importance in maintaining inter-group ties, establishing and recognizing individual status, gaining personal fulfillment through successful team action, and reaffirming in-group identity.

== Gameplay and materials ==
=== Historical ===
The game is played with two pairs of objects as a set, totaling four pieces per set. Historically, these objects were made from small sticks, stones, or bones. Bone counters were typically crafted from the lower forelegs of deer or horse shanks, while wooden counters were made from ashwood or green alder. The counters were held lengthwise within the player's fists and were either blank or marked with red or black bands around their circumference.

Historically, Slahal was mostly played by adult males, but some research found that young males and females also participate. The game is usually played by two players, but larger groups can also be involved.

Before the game starts, participants place wagers, which may include money, canoes, watches, ponies, coats, shirts, etc. Once the two teams were identified, they would sit in two lines, opposite each other, about fifteen feet apart, sometimes in an east-west direction. The players in front of each team are the mixers who mix and hide the marked bones. The players sit in the lines behind the mixers and act as supporters, and the spectators stand behind the teams.

The objective of Slahal is to have the designated team leader guess the location of the hidden chosen counter in the opponent's hand. The leader uses his hand gestures to quickly point to where he thinks the opposing team has hidden the counter. Both sides take turns until one side wins all of the counters. The game is usually accompanied by drums and singing to boost team morale. The musical accompaniment is also sometimes used to taunt the other team.

=== Modern ===
Modern Slahal is now open to all genders and takes place at summer festivals that run from May to mid-July. Slahal games can begin around early afternoon and end late at night or the morning of the next day. Modern wagers are changed in legal tender and range from one to ten dollars, and an addition to modern Slahal is the role of a bookkeeper (typically one of the female players) who keeps track of the wagers.

The two pairs of playing objects painted with red or black designs remain in modern versions of Slahal. While bone counters remain in use, wooden ones have become more common.

==== First phase ====
In contemporary versions of Slahal, the first phase of mixing the counters is conducted more openly. The team leader begins the mixing process, and after a minute they toss the pairs of counters to two players (of their choosing) on their team to continue mixing.

==== Second phase ====
Once the mixing is completed, the hands concealing the counters are held out for the opposing team’s leader to make a guess. In modern gameplay, team leaders try to guess the unmarked counters. This process continues between the two teams as they alternate being the mixing team, depending on if they won the round or not. The winner is determined when a team is able to obtain all the counter or tally pieces.

== See also ==
- Spoof (game)
- Indigenous peoples of the Pacific Northwest Coast
