= Chimakuan languages =

Native American language family

Chimakuan
- Geographic distribution: Olympic Peninsula, Washington
- Extinct: 1999 (Quileute)
- Linguistic classification: One of the world's primary language families
- Proto-language: Proto-Chimakuan
- Subdivisions: Chemakum; Quileute

Language codes
- ISO 639-2 / 5: nai
- Glottolog: chim1311
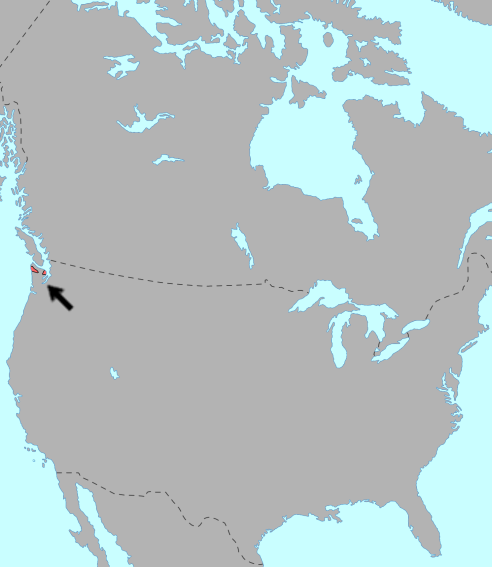
- Pre-contact distribution of Chimakuan languages

The Chimakuan languages are a group of extinct languages that were spoken in northwestern Washington state, United States, on the Olympic Peninsula. They were spoken by Chimakum, Quileute and Hoh tribes. They are part of the Mosan sprachbund, and one of its languages, Quileute, is famous for having no nasal consonants. The two languages were about as close as English and German. Due to proximity, the Chimakuan languages are also similar to Wakashan.

== Family division ==
- Chimakuan
  - † Chemakum (also known as Chimakum or Chimacum)
  - † Quileute (also known as Quillayute)

At one point, the Chimakuan languages were most likely distributed throughout what is now Western Washington, before retreating to the Olympic Peninsula after the expansion of the Coast Salish people. A 1877 report by George Gibbs claimed that he had been told that the Chimakuan people had at one point inhabited the upper portions of the Nisqually and Cowlitz Rivers. Additionally, Quileute oral history suggests that Chimakum and Quileute speaking communities were once neighbors in the region.

Chemakum is now extinct. It was spoken until the 1940s on the east side of the Olympic Peninsula between Port Townsend and Hood Canal. The name Chemakum is an Anglicized version of a Salishan word for the Chimakum people, such as the nearby Twana word čə́bqəb [t͡ʃə́bqəb] (earlier [t͡ʃə́mqəm]).

Quileute is also now extinct. During the late 20th and early 21st centuries a revitalization effort began, and it is today spoken as a second language by a relatively small amount of the Quileute tribe on the west coast of the Olympic Peninsula, south of Cape Flattery. The name Quileute comes from kʷoʔlí·yot' [kʷoʔléːjotʼ], the name of a village at La Push.

== Phonology ==
The Chimakuan languages have phonemic inventories similar to other languages of the region, with few vowels, ejective consonants, uvular consonants, and lateral affricates. However, both languages have typological oddities—Chemakum had no simple velar consonants, and Quileute has no nasal consonants—because of regular sound changes in these languages.

=== Proto-Chimakuan ===
The Proto-Chimakuan sound system, as reconstructed by Powell, contained three vowels, long and short, and lexical stress (accompanied by a higher pitch as in English). It had the consonants listed in the following table. In angle brackets ⟨⟩ following each IPA symbol are Powell's own (Americanist) notation, which shall be used henceforth instead of the IPA. The plain voiceless stops and affricates were probably mildly aspirated as in modern Quileute.

		Bilabial	Alveolar			Palatal	Velar		Uvular		Glottal
		Bilabial	plain	sibilant	lateral	Palatal	plain	labialized	plain	labialized	Glottal
Plosive/ Affricate	voiceless	p ⟨p⟩	t ⟨t⟩	t͡s ⟨c⟩		t͡ʃ ⟨č⟩	k ⟨k⟩	kʷ ⟨kʷ⟩	q ⟨q⟩	qʷ ⟨qʷ⟩	ʔ ⟨ʔ⟩
Plosive/ Affricate	ejective	pʼ ⟨p̓⟩	tʼ ⟨t̓⟩	t͡sʼ ⟨c̓⟩	t͡ɬʼ ⟨ƛ̓⟩	t͡ʃʼ ⟨č̓⟩	kʼ ⟨k̓⟩	kʷʼ ⟨k̓ʷ⟩	qʼ ⟨q̓⟩	qʷʼ ⟨q̓ʷ⟩	ʔ ⟨ʔ⟩
Fricative				s ⟨s⟩	ɬ ⟨ƚ⟩	ʃ ⟨š⟩	x ⟨x⟩	xʷ ⟨xʷ⟩	χ ⟨x̣⟩	χʷ ⟨x̣ʷ⟩	h ⟨h⟩
Sonorant	normal	m ⟨m⟩	n ⟨n⟩		l ⟨l⟩	j ⟨y⟩		w ⟨w⟩			
Sonorant	glottalized	ˀm ⟨m̓⟩	ˀn ⟨n̓⟩		ˀl ⟨l̓⟩	ˀj ⟨y̓⟩		ˀw ⟨w̓⟩			

The Proto-Chimakuan palato-alveolar fricative and affricates *š, *č, *č̓ developed as positional allophones of Pre-Proto-Chimakuan *xʷ, *kʷ, *k̓ʷ before the front vowel *i. This is why the Quileute and Chemakum reflexes of Proto-Chimakuan *xʷ, *kʷ, *k̓ʷ and *š, *č, *č̓ are largely in complementary distribution, though they are clearly phonemized in the modern languages (and probably already was in Late Proto-Chimakuan before it split) owing to loans and some irregular and analogical developments, especially in Chemakum. Note that the palatalization and delabialization of Pre-Proto-Chimakuan *xʷ, *kʷ, *k̓ʷ did not cause a merger with *x, *k, *k̓ at any point.

The regular reflexes of the Proto-Chimakuan consonant phonemes in the attested Chimakuan languages are tabled below. Where the official Quileute orthography or Boas' Chemakum transcription differ from the Proto-Chimakuan transcription (on whose IPA values, cf. table above), the orthographical representations have been given in angle brackets.

	Pre-Proto-Chimakuan	Proto-Chimakuan	Quileute	Chemakum
plain stops and affricates	*p	*p	p	p
plain stops and affricates	*t	*t	t	t
plain stops and affricates	*k	*k	k	č ⟨tc⟩
plain stops and affricates	*c	*c	c ⟨ts⟩	c ⟨ts⟩
plain stops and affricates	*kʷ	*č	č ⟨ch⟩	c ⟨ts⟩
plain stops and affricates	*kʷ	*kʷ	kʷ	kʷ ⟨ku⟩
plain stops and affricates	*q	*q	q ⟨ḳ⟩	q ⟨ʞ⟩
plain stops and affricates	*qʷ	*qʷ	qʷ ⟨ḳʷ⟩	qʷ ⟨ʞu⟩
glottalized stops and affricates	*p̓	*p̓	p̓	p̓ ⟨p!⟩
glottalized stops and affricates	*t̓	*t̓	t̓	t̓ ⟨t!⟩
glottalized stops and affricates	*ƛ̓	*ƛ̓	ƛ̓ ⟨t̓ƚ⟩	ƛ̓ ⟨t!lʻ⟩
glottalized stops and affricates	*k̓	*k̓	k̓	č̓ ⟨tc!⟩
glottalized stops and affricates	*c̓	*c̓	c̓ ⟨t̓s⟩	c̓ ⟨ts!⟩
glottalized stops and affricates	*k̓ʷ	*č̓	č̓ ⟨c̓h⟩	c̓ ⟨ts!⟩
glottalized stops and affricates	*k̓ʷ	*k̓ʷ	k̓ʷ	k̓ʷ ⟨k!u⟩
glottalized stops and affricates	*q̓	*q̓	q̓ ⟨ḳ̓⟩	q̓ ⟨ʞ!⟩
glottalized stops and affricates	*q̓ʷ	*q̓ʷ	q̓ʷ ⟨ḳ̓ʷ⟩	q̓ʷ ⟨ʞ!u⟩
glottalized stops and affricates	*ʔ	*ʔ	ʔ	ʔ ⟨′⟩
fricatives	*ƚ	*ƚ	ƚ	ƚ ⟨lʻ⟩
fricatives	*x	*x	x	š ⟨c⟩
fricatives	*s	*s	s	s
fricatives	*xʷ	*š	š ⟨sh⟩	s
fricatives	*xʷ	*xʷ	xʷ	xʷ ⟨qu⟩
fricatives	*x̣	*x̣	x̣	x̣ ⟨q⟩
fricatives	*x̣ʷ	*x̣ʷ	x̣ʷ	x̣ʷ ⟨qu⟩
fricatives	*h	*h	h	h
resonants	*m	*m	b	m
resonants	*n	*n	d	n
resonants	*l	*l	l	l
resonants	*y	*y	y	č ⟨tc⟩
resonants	*w	*w	w	kʷ ⟨ku⟩
glottalized resonants	*m̓	*m̓	b, ʔb	m, ʔm
glottalized resonants	*n̓	*n̓	d, ʔd	n, ʔn
glottalized resonants	*l̓	*l̓	l, ʔl	l, ʔl
glottalized resonants	*y̓	*y̓	y, ʔy	č ⟨tc⟩, ʔč
glottalized resonants	*w̓	*w̓	w, ʔw	kʷ ⟨ku⟩, ʔkʷ

Glottalized resonants, common in neighboring language families like Salishan, do not occur in either daughter language synchronically, but they must be reconstructed to account for some seemingly irregular correspondences between the languages with respect to occurrences of a glottal stop before resonant-reflexes, as well as language-internal evidence showing presence and absence of glottal stops around resonants in various related morphological forms, cf. Powell (1974) for more details.

Apart from the loss of glottalized resonants, Quileute has more-or-less kept the Proto-Chimakuan phonemic inventory unaltered. The only major change (sub-phonemic) is the infamous denasalization of *m (*m̓) and *n (*n̓) to (ʔ)b and (ʔ)d, respectively, ridding the language of nasal consonants except in certain archaïcizing narrative registers. Quileute also acquired the (presently rare) phonemes ƛ ⟨tƚ⟩ and g which occur primarily in loans but also a few words and morphemes of uncertain origin (and in the case of ƛ, phonemization of the biconsonantal sequence *t‿ƚ).

The development of Chemakum, on the other hand, has seen more significant changes. The Proto-Chimakuan palato-alveolar sibilants *š, *č, *č̓ were fronted and merged with the alveolar sibilants *s, *c, *c̓. Thereäfter the plain velars *x, *k, *k̓ were palatalized and affricated to š, č, č̓. The Proto-Chimakuan glides *y, *y̓, *w, *w̓ were subsequently (or concurrently) hardened to (ʔ)č and (ʔ)kʷ causing mergers (a few instances of the glides survive without hardening in Chimakum, e.g., in a demonstrative). A sub-table from the table above is reproduced below to illustrate these mergers more clearly. 88888888888888All of these developments have parallels in neighboring Salishan languages.

	Pre-Proto-Chimakuan	Proto-Chimakuan	Chemakum	Quileute
plain stops and affricates, along with plain and glottalized semi-vowels	*y̓	*y̓	č ⟨tc⟩ (ʔč)	y (ʔy)
plain stops and affricates, along with plain and glottalized semi-vowels	*y	*y	č ⟨tc⟩ (ʔč)	y (ʔy)
plain stops and affricates, along with plain and glottalized semi-vowels	*k	*k	č ⟨tc⟩ (ʔč)	k
plain stops and affricates, along with plain and glottalized semi-vowels	*c	*c	c ⟨ts⟩	c ⟨ts⟩
plain stops and affricates, along with plain and glottalized semi-vowels	*kʷ	*č	c ⟨ts⟩	č ⟨ch⟩
plain stops and affricates, along with plain and glottalized semi-vowels	*kʷ	*kʷ	kʷ ⟨ku⟩ (ʔkʷ)	kʷ
plain stops and affricates, along with plain and glottalized semi-vowels	*w	*w	kʷ ⟨ku⟩ (ʔkʷ)	w (ʔw)
plain stops and affricates, along with plain and glottalized semi-vowels	*w̓	*w̓	kʷ ⟨ku⟩ (ʔkʷ)	w (ʔw)
glottalized stops and affricates	*k̓	*k̓	č̓ ⟨tc!⟩	k̓
glottalized stops and affricates	*c̓	*c̓	c̓ ⟨ts!⟩	c̓ ⟨t̓s⟩
glottalized stops and affricates	*k̓ʷ	*č̓	c̓ ⟨ts!⟩	č̓ ⟨c̓h⟩
glottalized stops and affricates	*k̓ʷ	*k̓ʷ	k̓ʷ ⟨k!u⟩	k̓ʷ
fricatives	*x	*x	š ⟨c⟩	x
fricatives	*s	*s	s	s
fricatives	*xʷ	*š	s	š ⟨sh⟩
fricatives	*xʷ	*xʷ	xʷ ⟨qu⟩	xʷ

As an illustrative example, consider Chemakum čā́ʔᵃčis ⟨tcā′atcis⟩, Quileute káʔyis 'aunt' < Proto-Chimakuan *káy̓is.

The vocalic system of Proto-Chimakuan is much harder to reconstruct as Boas' Chemakum data don't allow for an unambiguous reading of the phonemic vowels in that language. However, assuming a Quileute-like 3-vowel system with an extra parameter of vowel length, Powel was able to reconstruct a similar provisional vocalic inventory for the proto-language: short *a, *e, *o, and long *a·, *e·, *o·. Stress was phonemic. In Quileute, the stress became fixed to the penultimate syllable, though subsequent changes made it somewhat unpredictable. Open syllables developed long vowels.

== Morphology ==
There are more than 20 known common inflectional suffixed and about 200 derivational suffixes. No common prefixes are known. In some cases, infixes are used in both languages.

== Lexicon ==
Below is a table listing numerals from 1 to 10 in Chemakum and Quileute. Only 1 through 4 and 6 are cognate, the rest being independently innovated in the two languages.

Numeral	Chemakum	Quileute	Proto-Chimakuan
1	kuē′lʻ *[kʷʰíːɬ]	wı̇́·ƚ [wéːɬ]	*wé·ƚ
2	lʻa′kua *[ˈɬä́(ʔ)kʷʰä]	ƚáʔw [ɬä́ʔw]	*ƚáw̓-
3	ʞoā′lē *[ˈqʷʰä́ː(ʔ)li]	ḳʷáʔl [qʰʷä́ʔl]	*qʷál̓-
4	mĕ′ēs *[mɘˈʔís]	báʔyas [ˈbä́ʔjəs]	*may̓ás
5	tcā′aa *[ˈt͡ʃʰä́ːʔä]	tá·si [ˈtʰä́ːsɪ]	
6	tsĕ′lʻas *[t͡sʰɘ(ʔ)ˈɬäs]	chiƚá·si [t͡ʃʰɪˈɬä́ːsɪ]	*čiƚás-
7	ts!ʞō′olkoant [t͡sʼɵˈqʰóːʔolkʰʷɐntʰ]	ƚaʔwáḳt̓sisi [ɬəʔˈwäqt͡sʼɪsɪ]	
8	ʞ!ʼoa′yēkoant *[ˈqʷʼä́jikʰʷɐntʰ]	ƚaʔwı̇́·t̓aƚi [ɬəʔˈwéˑˀtʼəɬɪ]	
9	kuē′lʻtsqal *[ˈkʷʰiɬt͡sχɐl]	wı̇́ƚt̓aƚi [ˈwɪ́ɬtʼəɬɪ]	
10	tc!ʼē′taa *[ˈt͡ʃʼí(ː)tʰäʔä]	t̓ó·pa [tʼoˑʰpʰə]	

== Bibliography ==
- Andrade, Manuel J. (1933). Quileute. New York: Columbia University Press. (Extract from Handbook of American Indian Languages (Vol. 3, pp. 151–292); Andrade's doctoral dissertation).
- Andrade, Manuel J. (1953). Notes on the relations between Chemakum and Quileute. International Journal of American Linguistics, 19, 212–215.
- Andrade, Manuel J.; & Frachtenberg, Leo J. (1931). Quileute texts. Columbia University contributions to anthropology (Vol. 12). New York: Columbia University Press.
- Boas, Franz. (1892). Notes on the Chemakum language. American Anthropologist, 5, 37–44.
- Campbell, Lyle. (1997). American Indian languages: The historical linguistics of Native America. New York: Oxford University Press. ISBN 0-19-509427-1.
- Mithun, Marianne. (1999). The languages of Native North America. Cambridge: Cambridge University Press. ISBN 0-521-23228-7 (hbk); ISBN 0-521-29875-X.
- Powell, James V. (1974). Proto-Chimakuan: Materials for a Reconstruction. Working Papers in Linguistics (Vol. 7, № 2), Department of Linguistics, University of Hawaiʻi.
