= Chemakum language =

Extinct Chimakuan language

Chemakum
- Aqoʞúlo
- Pronunciation: /ʔaˈxʷóqʷolo/
- Native to: Olympic Peninsula, Washington
- Ethnicity: Chimakum
- Extinct: 1940s
- Language family: Chimakuan: Chemakum

Language codes
- ISO 639-3: xch
- Glottolog: chim1310

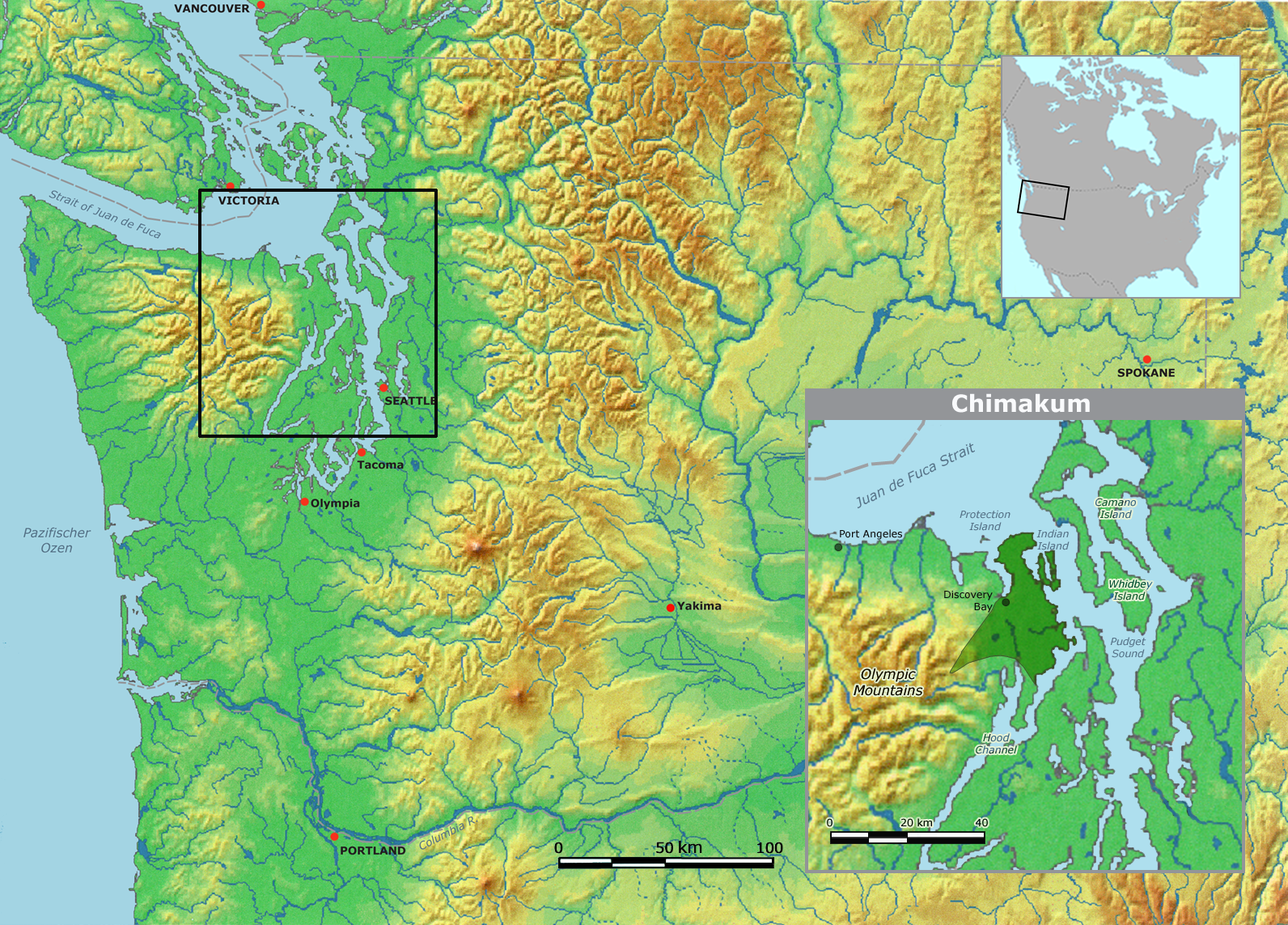
Map of Chimakum traditional tribal territory

Chemakum (/ˈtʃɛməkʌm/ CHEM-ək-um; also written as Chimakum or Chimacum) is an extinct Chimakuan language once spoken by the Chemakum, a Native American group that once lived on western Washington state's Olympic Peninsula. It was closely related to the Quileute language, also extinct but undergoing revitalization in the early 21st century. In the 1860s, Chief Seattle and the Suquamish people killed many of the Chimakum people. In 1890, Franz Boas found out about only three speakers, and they spoke it imperfectly, of whom he managed to gather linguistic data from one, a woman named Louise Webster (her brother was another speaker of the three).

The name Chemakum is an anglicization of the Salishan name for the Chimakum people, perhaps old Twana čə́mqəm (currently čə́bqəb [t͡ʃə́bqəb]).

== Phonology ==
Boas’ original article based on fieldwork with one of the last three native speakers in the summer of 1890 uses the following consonantal symbols: ‹h; k, ʞ, q; u; y; n; t; s, c, t_{ç}; ts, tc; m, p; l, lʻ; ′› along with ejectivization usually notated by a following ‹!› on stops and affricates, but sometimes also by a following ‹ߴ›. Labio-dorsals and the lateral ejective were analyzed as consonant clusters as the transcription shows. Based on his own description (in a footnote) and words and sentences cited, along with some comparison to Quileute cognates, the following phonemic inventory can be determined (the plain uvulars were probably pre-uvular and the plain stops and affricates were probably somewhat aspirated as in most languages of the region including Quileute):

		Bilabial	Alveolar			Palato- alveolar	Labio- velar	Uvular		Glottal
		Bilabial	plain	sibilant	lateral	Palato- alveolar	Labio- velar	plain	labial	Glottal
Plosive/ Affricate	plain	p ‹p›	t ‹t›	t͡s ‹ts›		t͡ʃ ‹tc›	kʷ ‹ku›	q ‹ʞ›	qʷ ‹ʞu›	ʔ ‹′›
Plosive/ Affricate	ejective	pʼ ‹p!›	tʼ ‹t!›	t͡sʼ ‹ts!›	t͡ɬʼ ‹t!lʻ›	t͡ʃʼ ‹tc!›	kʷʼ ‹k!u›	qʼ ‹ʞ!›	qʷʼ ‹ʞ!u›	ʔ ‹′›
Fricative				s ‹s›	ɬ ‹lʻ›	ʃ ‹c›		χ ‹q›	χʷ ‹qu›	h ‹h›
Sonorant		m ‹m›	n ‹n›		l ‹l›	j ‹y›	w ‹u›			

Transcription is not fully standardized and some amount of variation is attested. For example, some instances of ejectives are double-marked with both ‹!› and a following ‹ߴ›. Compare the independent word ‘back’ written ‹ʞ!ߴē′enōkoat› against the corresponding lexical suffix, written ‹-ʞ!ĕnuk›. Similarly, the lexical suffix for ‘hand’ appears as ‹-t!ߴa›. Here, the Quileute cognate ‹-t̓ay› shows that, despite the notation, the sound was probably just an ejective t. Yet another notation for an ejective – simply a following apostrophe – may be found in the word ‹ʞ!ߴautߴátct›, perhaps ‘bracelet’, if this is indeed cognate to Quileute ‹ḳ̓aḳ̓ʷò·t̓á·yat› ‘bracelet’; and in ‹tcߴālʻa› ‘stone’, cognate to Quileute ‹k̓á·t̓ƚa› ‘stone’.

The labio-dorsals were not analyzed as unit consonants by Boas. The audible rounding on them was either marked as a glide, or the rounding was notationally transferred to a neighboring vowel. Consider the following examples: ‹kuē′lʻ› ‘one’ (Quileute ‹wí·ƚ›), ‹lʻa′kua› ‘two’ (Quileute ‹ƚáʔw›), ‹ʞoā′lē› ‘three’ (Quileute ‹ḳʷáʔl›), ‹-kō› ‘canoe (lexical suffix)’ (Quileute ‹-kʷ›), ‹-ʞōs› ‘neck (lexical suffix)’ (Quileute ‹-ḳ̓ʷó·s›), ‹-t_{ç}uʞ› ‘our’ (Quileute ‹-t̓oqʷ›) etc.

The meaning of Boas’ ‹t_{ç}› is not entirely certain. Swadesh, working with Boas’ data half a century later, decided to interpret ‹t_{ç}› as /t͡ʃʼ/ – in his notation ‹ч̓› – but it is not clear why, especially considering that /t͡ʃʼ/ is written differently in ‹tcߴālʻa› ‘stone’. Boas himself describes the sound as “dento-alveolar t”, which is not very helpful. Based on comparative evidence from Quileute, Powell interprets ‹t_{ç}› as a variant symbol for /t/ (perhaps notating some allophonic difference that Boas perceived).

Swadesh added a distinction between labio-velar and labio-uvular fricatives for which there is no explicit evidence in Boas’ paper yielding the system below:

		Bilabial	Alveolar			Palato- alveolar	Labio- velar	Uvular		Glottal
		Bilabial	plain	sibilant	lateral	Palato- alveolar	Labio- velar	plain	labial	Glottal
Plosive/ Affricate	plain	p	t	t͡s		t͡ʃ	kʷ	q	qʷ	ʔ
Plosive/ Affricate	ejective	pʼ	tʼ	t͡sʼ	t͡ɬʼ	t͡ʃʼ	kʷʼ	qʼ	qʷʼ	ʔ
Fricative				s	ɬ	ʃ	xʷ	χ	χʷ	h
Sonorant		m	n		l	j	w			

Boas transcribed several distinct vowels in the published account of Chemakum (and a few more in his unpublished fieldnotes): ‹ā, a, ē, e, ĕ, ī, ō›, along with a marginal ‹u› whose main purpose was to indicate rounding adjacent to labio-dorsal consonants. The list was reduced to a much simpler phonemic inventory of three short vowels /i a o/ and three long vowels /iː aː oː/ by Powell. The vowels probably exhibited some amount of allophonic variation as Boas’ original transcription shows, but according to Andrade, less so than in Quileute.

== See also ==
- Quileute language
- Chimakuan languages
