= Potlatch State Park =

State park in the U.S. state of Washington

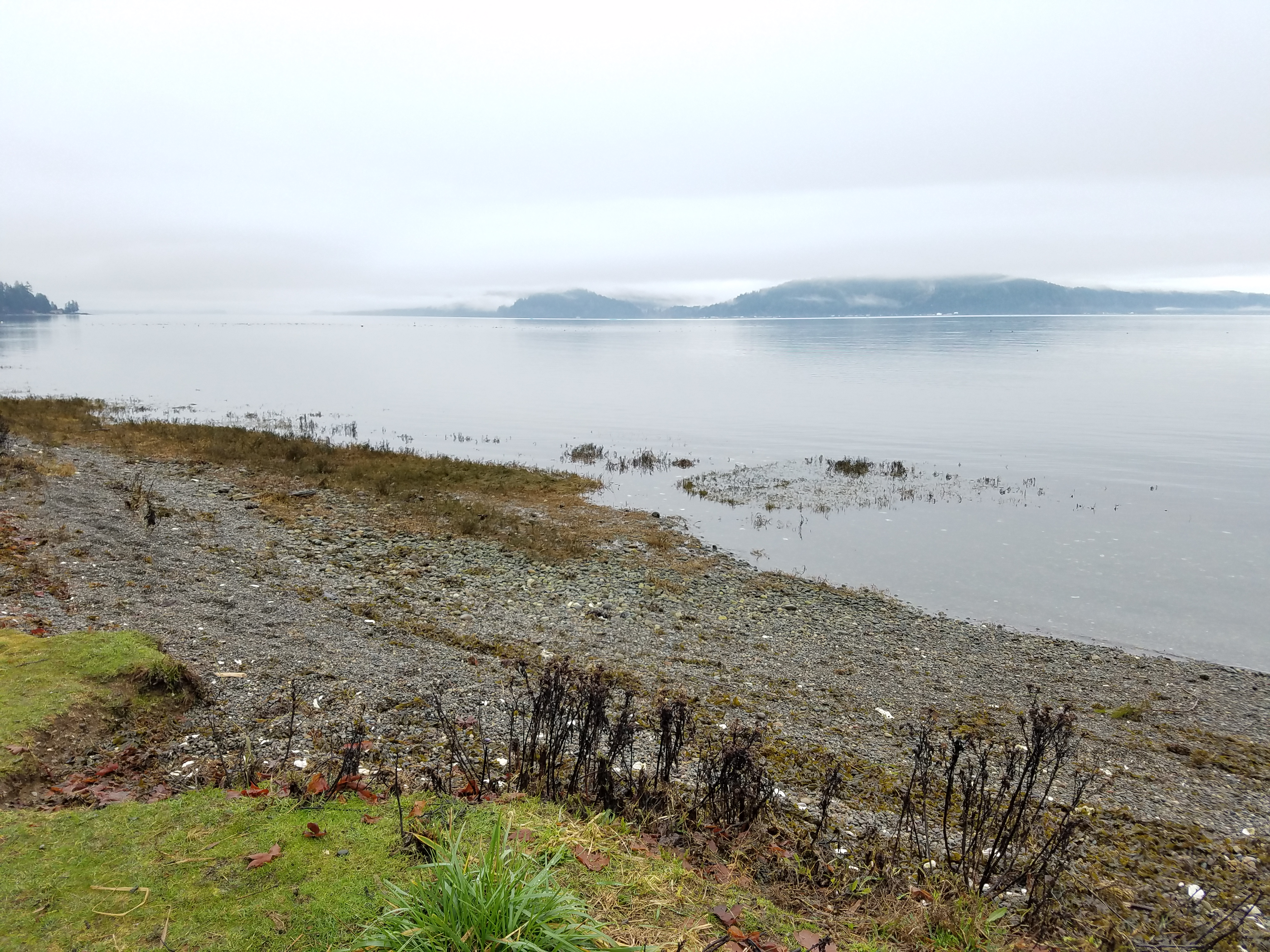

- Location within Washington (state) Location within the United States
- Location: Mason County, Washington, United States
- Coordinates: 47°21′43″N 123°09′20″W
- Area: 57 acres (23 ha)
- Established: 1960
- Administrator: Washington State Parks and Recreation Commission
- Visitors: 221,474 (in 2024)
- Website: Official website

Potlatch State Park is a 57-acre (23 ha) Washington state park located on Hood Canal near the town of Potlatch in Mason County. The park offers camping, hiking, boating, fishing, shellfish harvesting, beachcombing, and sailboarding.

Potlatch State Park was opened in 1960 on a prime piece of land that was traditionally territory of the Skokomish people. The creation of this park has been the subject of land claims brought by the Skokomish people.

The namesake of the Potlatch State Park, specifically the word "potlatch", refers to a gift-giving feast and ceremony practiced by Indigenous people of the Pacific Northwest Coast of Canada and the United States.
