= Spoof (game) =

Guessing game played with coins

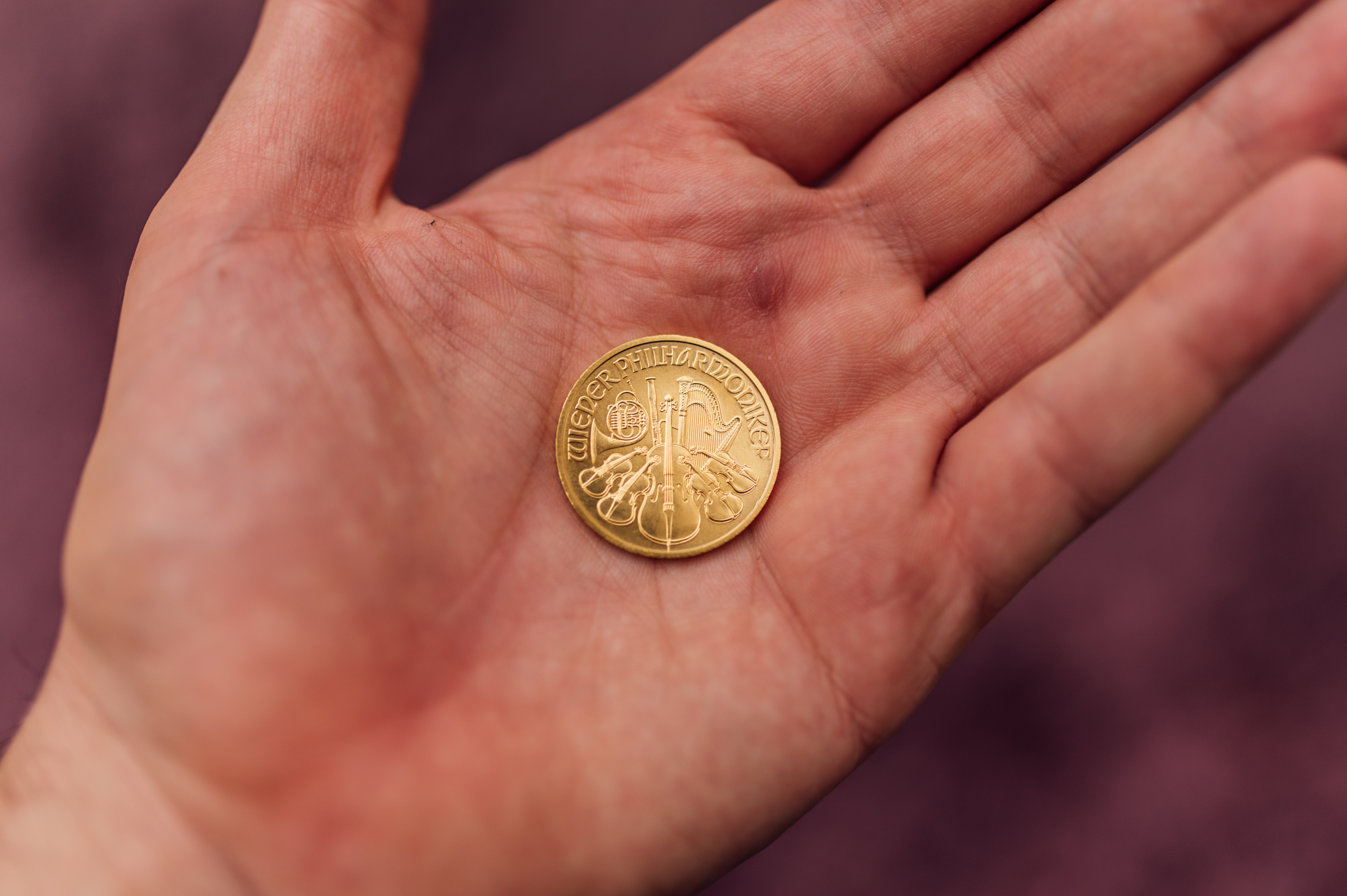
Each player conceals and then reveals a number of coins in their hand

Spoof is a strategy game, typically played as a gambling game, often in bars and pubs where the loser buys the other participants a round of drinks. Each player conceals between zero and three coins in their hand, then each makes a guess of the total held.

The exact origin of the game is unknown, but one scholarly paper addressed it, and more general n-coin games, in 1959. It is an example of a zero-sum game. The version with three coins is sometimes known under the name Three Coin.

== Gameplay ==
Spoof is played by any number of players in a series of rounds. In each round the objective is to guess the aggregate number of coins held in concealment by all the players, with each player being allowed to conceal up to three coins in their hand, without the other players seeing the amount. (Some versions of the game may vary this number.) The coins may be of any denomination, and the values of the coins are irrelevant: in fact, any suitable objects could be used in place of coins, e.g. matches.

For the first round an initial player is selected in some fashion, such as spinning a burnt match to see who it points at.

At the beginning of every round each player conceals a quantity of coins, or no coins at all, in their closed fist, extended into the circle of play. The initial player calls what they think is the total number of coins in play. Play proceeds clockwise around the circle until each player has ventured a call regarding the total number of coins, and no player can call the same total as any other player. The call of "Spoof!" is used to mean "zero".

After all players have made their calls, they open their fists and display their coins for the group to count the total. It is illegal for a player to open their hand without making a call. The player who has correctly guessed the total number of coins withdraws from the game and the remainder of the group proceeds to the next round. If no player guesses the total correctly, the entire group continues play in the next round. The starting player for each subsequent round is the next remaining player, clockwise from the starter of the previous round.

Play continues until all players have been eliminated except for one, whereupon that last remaining player pays the stipulated stakes to each other player. In some versions of the game additional rules are used, such as "no gloating" (a leaving player is not allowed to celebrate), or left-handed play.

== Mathematical analysis ==
This first caller is at a disadvantage for lacking any insight into how many coins the others might be holding. As more calls are made, this gives some information about how many coins each player might hold. For example, if the second player to call in a three-player game guesses "nine", that should suggest to the third player that the second player is holding three coins: they would not consider every player holding three coins to be a winning possibility if they themselves held fewer than three.

Some variants also have a 'no bum shouts' or 'impossible call' rule whereby a player cannot call more than the total number of coins possible taking into account what they have in their hand (e.g. if there are 5 players and they hold 1 coin, the maximum number to call would be 13).

The generalized (n-coin) two player version of this game was the subject of a paper in 1959. It was shown that for every n ≥ 1 this game is a "fair game", i.e. each player has a mixed strategy that guarantees their expected payout is at most zero to his or her opponent.

== Tournament play ==
The World Spoofing Championship was staged at James Cook Hotel, Wellington New Zealand, and has taken place every year since 1983 in many different venues across the world.

Many countries hold national or regional spoofing championships with the UK being the oldest having first taken place in 1974. The Bangkok Gentlemen Spoofers founded in 1988 is the longest running spoofing school in South East Asia. They hold two annual tournaments, the Thai National Championships and the Asian Spoofing Championships.

The original national UK Spoof Championship celebrated its 41st anniversary in 2015 with the tournament held at Cambridge Rugby Club on 16 October. The "Weald of Kent Spoof Championships" has been held annually at "The Bull at Benenden" in Benenden, Kent since 2007, with 32 players taking part in 2010.

== In popular culture ==
James Bond plays the game against Felix Leiter in the 2021 film No Time to Die. Actor Daniel Craig was taught the game by his father, a pub landlord.

The fourth episode of the eighth season of New Zealand detective drama series The Brokenwood Mysteries was set at a world championship match where the winner was then murdered.

Joan Crawford wins a round of the game against Jack Palance in the 1952 film Sudden Fear. In the film, the game is played with matches and is introduced as "The Match Game."

== See also ==
- Morra (game) – Hand game
- Slahal – Gambling game
- Up Jenkins – Party game
