= Pot luck =

Pot luck may refer to:

- Potluck, a form of group gathering, usually involving a meal
- Pot Luck (1936 film)
- L'Auberge espagnole, a 2002 film also released in Britain and Canada under the title Pot Luck
- Pot Luck (Elvis Presley album), a 1962 record album by Elvis Presley
- Pot Luck (Ramsey Lewis album), a 1963 record album by Ramsey Lewis
- Potluck (group), a hip hop duo from Humboldt County, CA
- Pot-Bouille, 1882 French novel by Émile Zola
- Pot Luck (TV series), an Australian television series broadcast in 1987

== See also ==
- Potlatch (disambiguation)
