= Skokomish River =

Coordinates: 47°20′24″N 123°7′4″W

Skokomish River squʔquʔ (Twana)
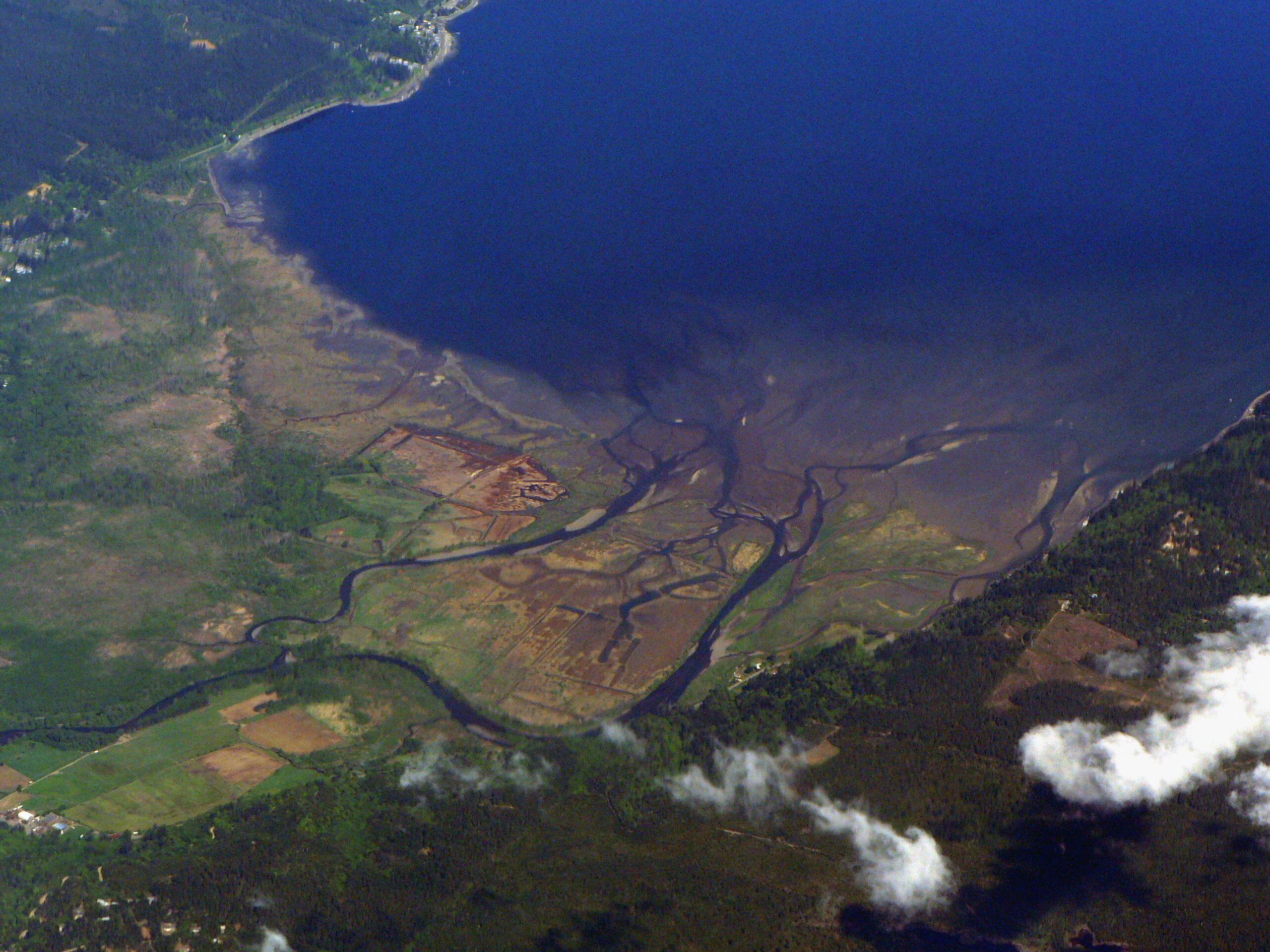
- Skokomish River Delta on Hood Canal

Location
- Country: United States

Physical characteristics
- Source
  - location: Mount Skokomish, Olympic Mountains (North Fork); Sundown Pass, Olympic Mountains (South Fork)
- Mouth
  - location: Hood Canal
  - elevation: sea level
- Length: 69 km (43 mi)
- Basin size: 588 km^{2} (227 sq mi)
- Discharge
  - average: 34.3 m^{3}/s (1,210 cu ft/s)

The Skokomish River (Twana: squʔquʔ) is a river in Mason County, Washington, United States. It is the largest river flowing into Hood Canal, a western arm of Puget Sound. From its source at the confluence of the North and South Forks the main stem Skokomish River is approximately 9 miles (14 km) long. The longer South Fork Skokomish River is 40 miles (64 km), making the length of the whole river via its longest tributary about 49 miles (79 km). The North Fork Skokomish River is approximately 34 miles (55 km) long. A significant part of the Skokomish River's watershed is within Olympic National Forest and Olympic National Park.

== Etymology and naming ==
The Twana-language name for the Skokomish River is squʔquʔ, meaning "river." The North Fork Skokomish River is known as disɬabux̌t, and the South Fork Skokomish River as duxʷsiq̓ʷ.

The name in English, "Skokomish," comes from the Twana name for the Indigenous inhabitants of the Skokomish watershed, the Skokomish people, squqəʔbəš (also spelled squqəʔəbəš, and meaning "river people" or "people of the river"). The Skokomish were the largest of the nine different Twana communities before their amalgamation onto the reservation in the 1850s. Within these nine communities there were at least 33 settlements.

== Course ==
The Skokomish River and its two tributary forks drain the southeast corner of the Olympic Mountains, mainly in Mason County but including a portion of Jefferson County. The main stem Skokomish River is formed by the confluence of the North Fork and South Fork near small community of Mohrweis. It flows east through the broad Skokomish Valley. After being crossed by U.S. Route 101 the river turns northeast. Washington State Route 106 crosses the river near its mouth on Hood Canal. Near the towns of Union and Skokomish the Skokomish River enters Annas Bay at the bend of Hood Canal from the south, where it creates a large estuary called Skokomish Flats. The lower portion of the river flows along the southern portion of the Skokomish Indian Reservation.

The South Fork Skokomish River originates near Sundown Pass in Olympic National Park, near the sources of the Wynoochee River and Graves Creek, a tributary of the Quinault River. The South Fork flows southeast out of the national park and between Capitol Peak, on the west, and Wonder Mountain on the east. After receiving Rule Creek from the west the South Fork turns more directly south and enters a broader valley. It receives Church Creek from the west, then turns to flow southeast and east through a widening river valley. A number of tributary streams join the South Fork, including Pine Creek and Cedar Creek, from the south, and Le Bar Creek, Brown Creek, and Harp Creek from the north. The South Fork Skokomish leaves the main Olympic Mountains and enters flatter terrain, but flows through gorges for several miles. After exiting the gorges the South Fork turns east and enters the broad Skokomish Valley where it joins with the North Fork to form the main stem Skokomish River.

Skokomish River Suspension Bridge at Staircase, 2026

The North Fork Skokomish River originates on the northern slopes of Mount Skokomish. It flows west into Olympic National Park. The valley of the North Fork Skokomish is used for one of the national park's main backcountry hiking trails. At the junction of Nine Stream, the river turns south, then turns southeast and receives a number of tributaries including Four Stream and Slate Creek. The river rushes over Staircase Rapids shortly upriver from Staircase Campground and the national park's Staircase Ranger Station. The Staircase area is the main entry into the southeast portion of Olympic National Park. The North Fork receives Elk Creek at the campground and Lincoln Creek shortly downstream. The river then meanders southeast into Lake Cushman, a reservoir created to supply Tacoma with electricity. The tributary Big Creek enters the lake near Lake Cushman State Park. The North Fork exits Lake Cushman's southern end and flows a short distance to another reservoir, Lake Kokanee, from which it flows south into the Skokomish Valley to join the South Fork, forming the main stem Skokomish River. Lake Cushman and Lake Kokanee are maintained by Cushman Dam No. 1 and Cushman Dam No. 2 respectively.

== History ==
The Skokomish River area has been inhabited by humans for millennia. The Indigenous people of Hood Canal, the Twana, lived on and fished the watershed of the Skokomish River for generations. While all Twana did camp on the river and use its resources, it was primarily the Skokomish who lived along the river and at its mouth. The Skokomish would inhabit large winter villages during the winter months for traditional celebrations and activities; in the summer, they dispersed to various spots along the river and for hunting, gathering, and other activities. The Skokomish had four winter villages on the Skokomish River: at the confluence of the North and South Forks, called yəlal̕qu; at McTaggert Creek on the North Fork (Twana: x̌c̓ay̓ay); slightly upriver from McTaggert Creek at a flat in the river called č̓əlaxʷcəd; and below the falls at Lake Kokanee (Twana: č̓uq̓ʷaɬəɬ). There were no winter settlements on the South Fork, but there were extensive summer settlements in the upper reaches of the valleys used for elk hunting. There were at least 20 settlement areas in total along the Skokomish River and the area at its mouth.

Prior to the construction of the Cushman Hydroelectric Project, the Skokomish River was once the largest and most productive salmon-producing river in the Hood Canal region of Puget Sound. The entire flow of the North Fork was normally diverted at Cushman Dam No. 2, except for instream flow requirements and infrequent larger releases. On January 12, 2009, Tacoma Power, the Skokomish Tribe, and state and federal agencies signed settlement agreements that resolved long-standing disputes and damage claims relating to the Cushman Hydroelectric Project. As part of the settlement water will be released into the North Fork Skokomish River below the dams in order to mimic natural flow.

The South Fork's drainage was heavily logged, although logging has been significantly reduced in the Olympic National Forest since the late 1980s.

== Flooding ==
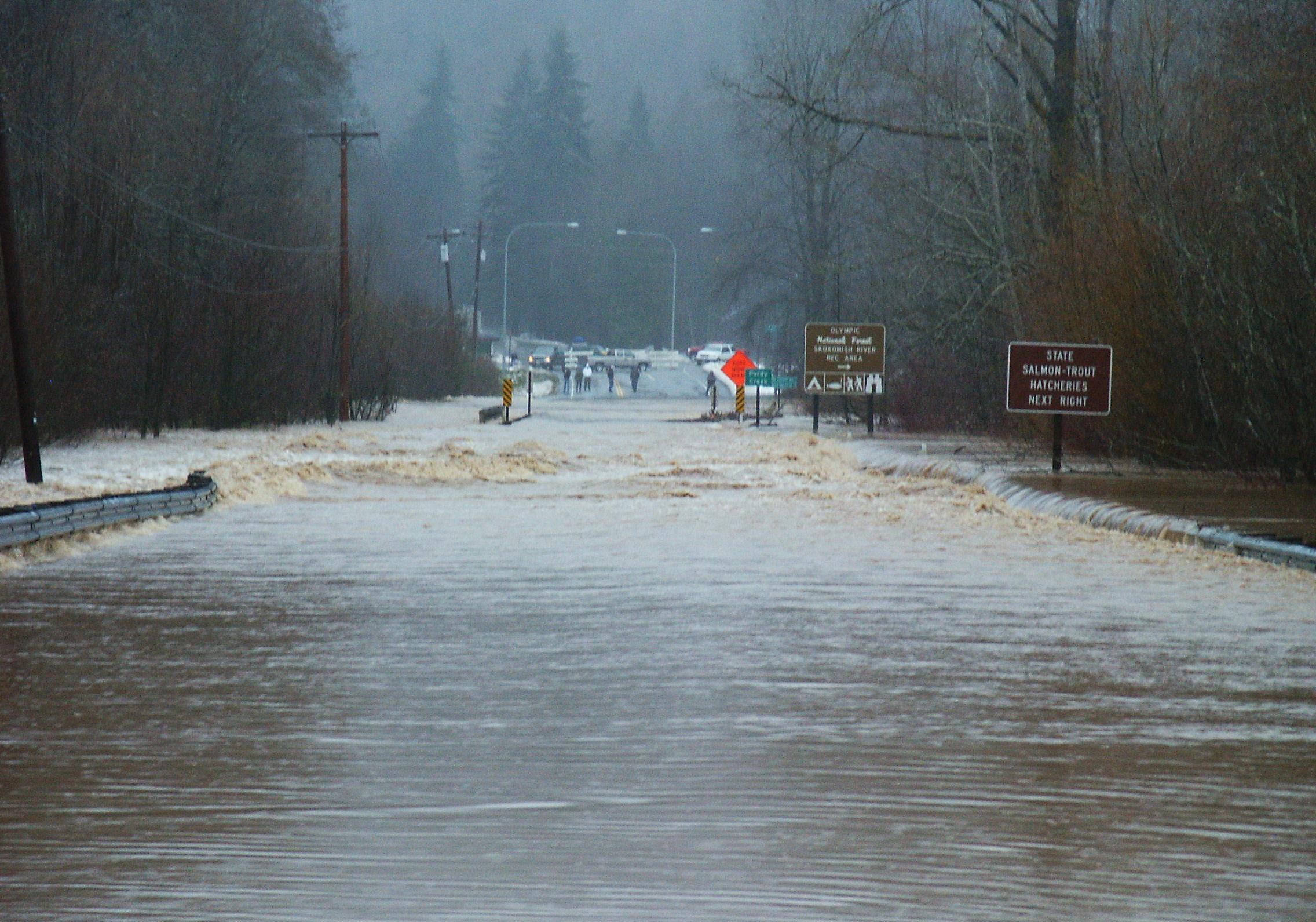
During the December 2007 Pacific Northwest storms, the Skokomish River flooded U.S. Route 101 north of Shelton to a depth of nearly four feet (over a meter). Photo taken December 3, 2007, at the height of the storms.

The Skokomish is the most flood-prone river in Washington State, as it is the first river to flood during any major rain event. It set an all-time record-high flood level on December 3, 2007, when an intense tropical rainstorm moved in following several inches of snow from the day prior. Its maximum discharge of 29,000 cubic feet (820 m^{3}) per second, recorded on December 3, 2007, was more than twenty times its mean flow, and bested its previous record set on November 5, 1934, at more than 27,000 cubic feet (760 m^{3}) per second. The floods completely ripped up Highway 101 through the Skokomish Valley, resulting in two-day closure while emergency repairs were made. The 2007 flood event prompted Mason County officials and the Washington Department of Transportation in conjunction with the Skokomish Tribe, to design and construct a newer, elevated roadway structure over the area of Purdy Creek, which is the lowest point in elevation in the valley that Highway 101 crosses. After 16 months of planning and construction, a 350-foot bridge elevated 12 feet higher than the original roadway was opened in July 2009.

One notable flood in 1996 closed U.S. Route 101 and State Route 106 for four days, stranding a KOMO-TV news crew from Seattle. The Skokomish River is a popular location for television and print journalists to cover regional foods, including the joke "Why did the salmon cross the road?"

The combination of increased sediment load due to extensive clearcut logging, the reduced sediment carrying capacity due to the damming of the North Fork, and winter-weather rain patterns are suspected to be the primary reasons for the flooding that occurs almost every year on the South Fork. In late fall through early spring, storms often come from the southwest. These usually drop the most rain in the vicinity of the Skokomish River due to the topography of the Olympic Peninsula. Notably, the Skokomish Tribe, through the restoration of the Skokomish delta, (The Nallies Project), removed dikes surrounding Nallies Island, relieving some of the flooding in the valley. Recently on the second highest flood event recorded after the restoration, the flooding was only minor, compared with what it would have been before, moderate to severe flooding. Additionally, it is suspected that tectonic uplift of the land around the lower Skokomish River may be contributing to flooding by decreasing the gradient of the river channel, even prior to any major anthropogenic disturbances.

== See also ==
- List of rivers of Washington (state)
