= Cushman Dam No. 2 =

- Cushman No. 2 Hydroelectric Power Plant
- U.S. National Register of Historic Places
- U.S. Historic district
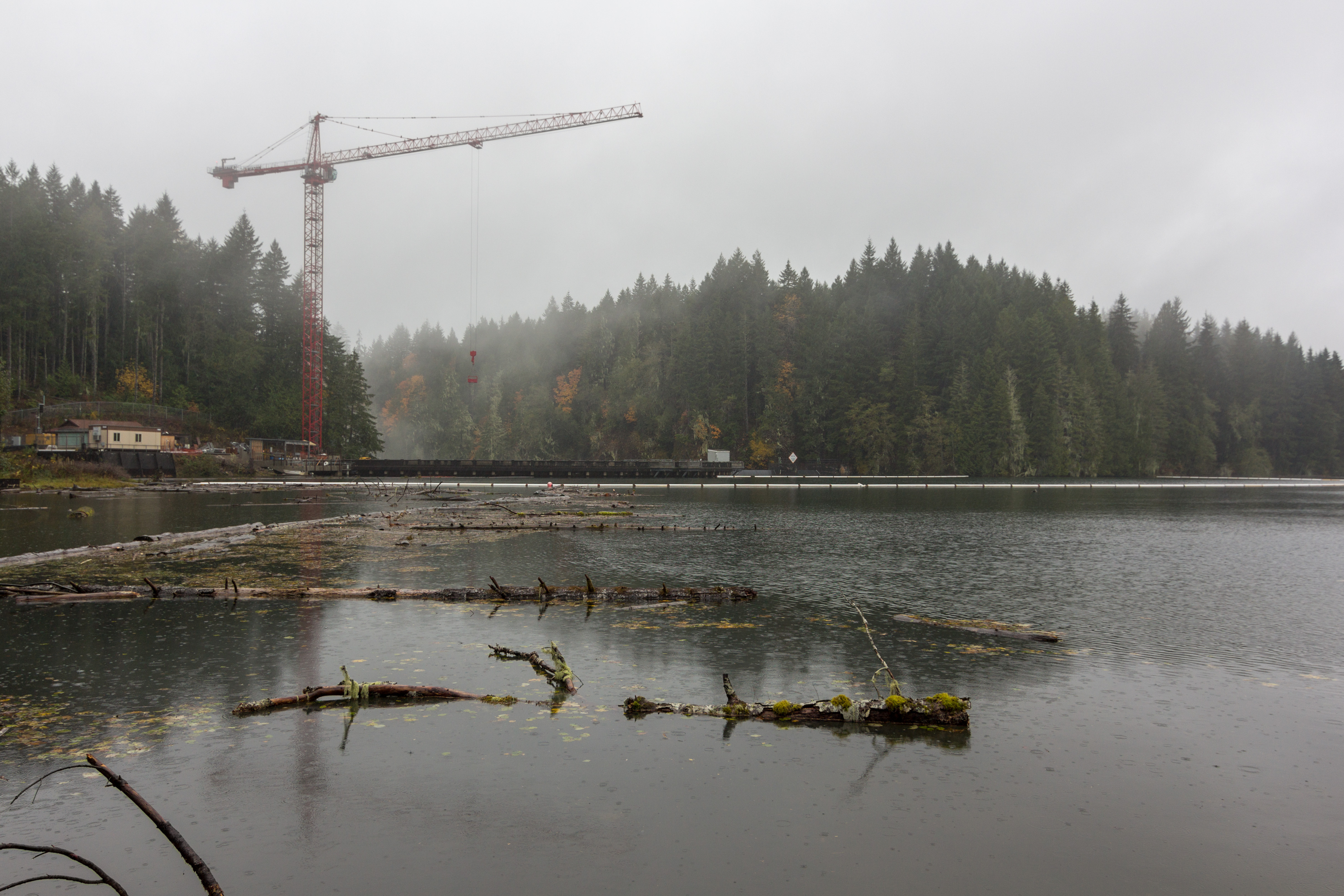
- Cushman Dam No. 2, seen from Kokanee

- Location within Washington (state) Location within the United States
- Location: Mason County, Washington, US
- Nearest city: Hoodsport, Washington
- Coordinates: 47°23′52″N 123°12′04″W
- Area: 25 acres (10 ha)
- Built: 1930
- Architect: Tacoma City Light; J.E. Bonnel & Sons
- Architectural style: Classical Revival
- MPS: Hydroelectric Power Plants in Washington State, 1890–1938 MPS
- NRHP reference No.: 88002757
- Added to NRHP: December 15, 1988

Cushman Dam No. 2 is a hydroelectric dam on the North Fork of the Skokomish River in Mason County, Washington, United States, forming Lake Kokanee. Built in 1930, its three 27-megawatt generators provide 233 thousand megawatt-hours annually to the Tacoma Power system. Along with Cushman Dam No. 1, it is part of Tacoma Power's Cushman Project.

Construction began in 1929 and power production began in December 1930. The dam is 575 feet (175 m) long, 8 feet (2.4 m) wide at the top and 40 feet (12 m) at the base. It is 235 feet tall. Its reservoir, Lake Kokanee, is 2 miles (3.2 km) long.

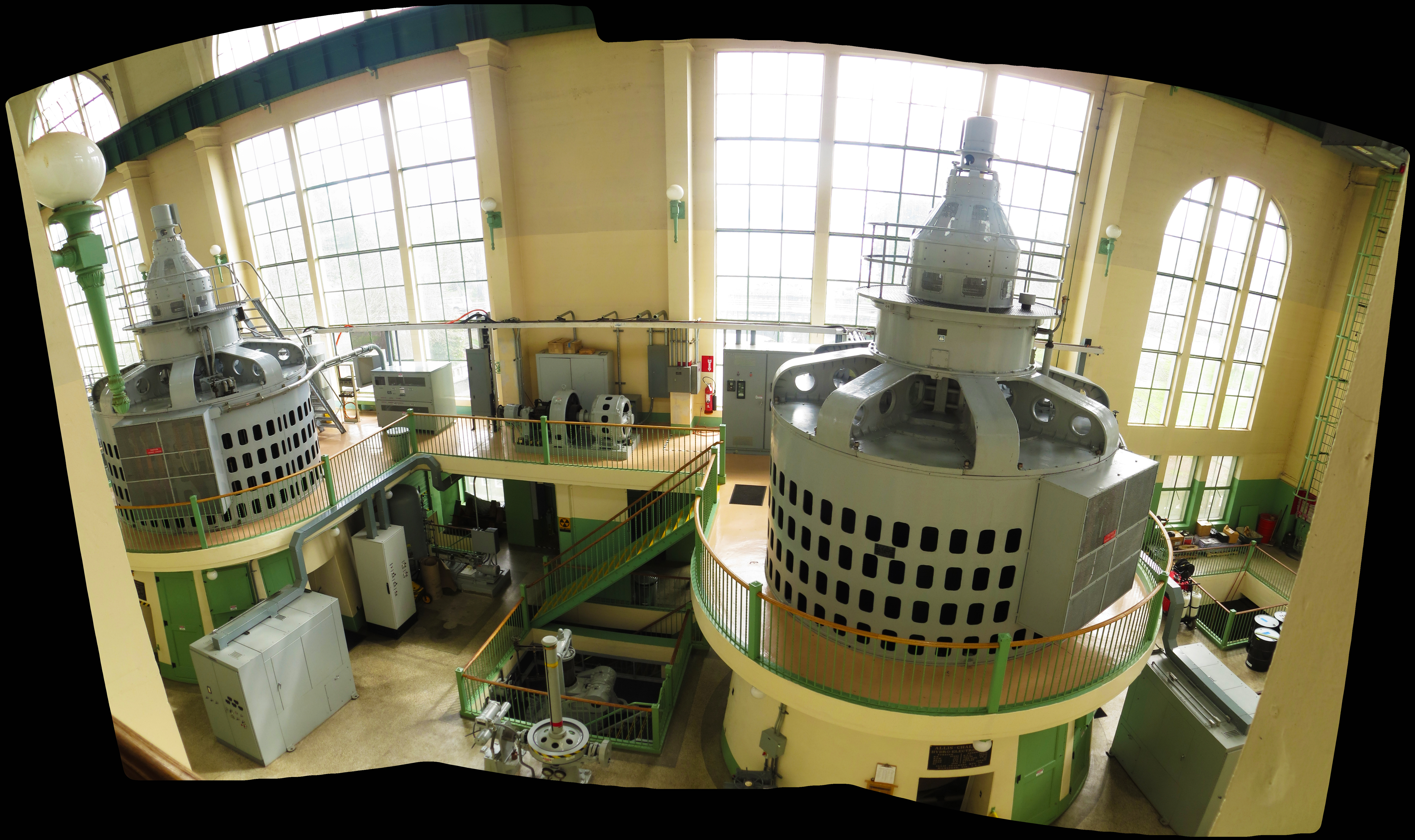
A panoramic view showing two of the three turbines in their original housing at the Cushman Dam No. 2 powerhouse, operated by Tacoma Public Utilities.

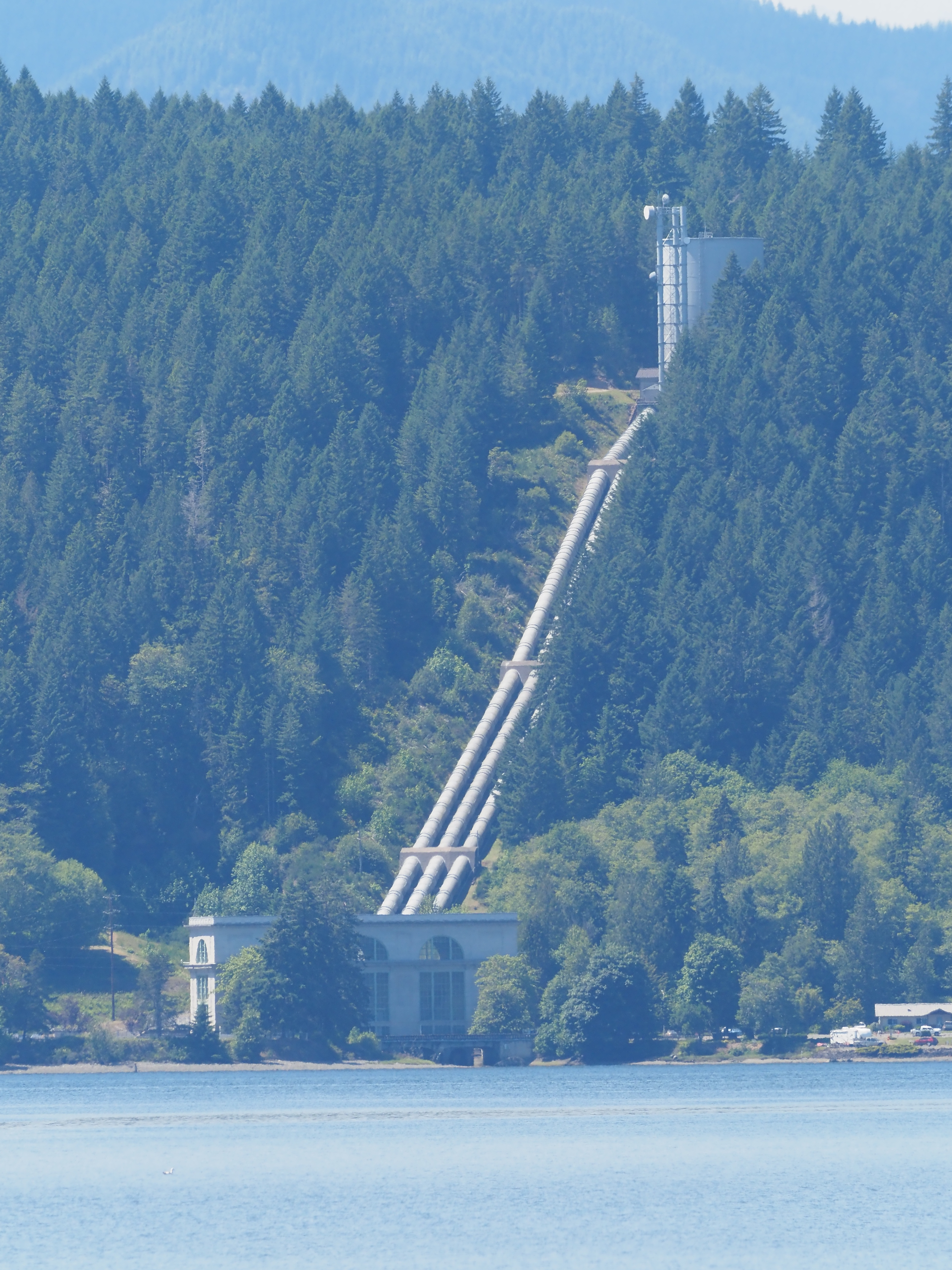
A view of the penstocks and generating station from the other side of Hood Canal.

== Hydroelectric power capacity ==
Generator	Nameplate Capacity (MW)
31	27.0
32	27.0
33	27.0
Total	81.0

== See also ==
- Cushman Dam No. 1
- National Register of Historic Places listings in Mason County, Washington
