= Skokomish Indian Tribe =

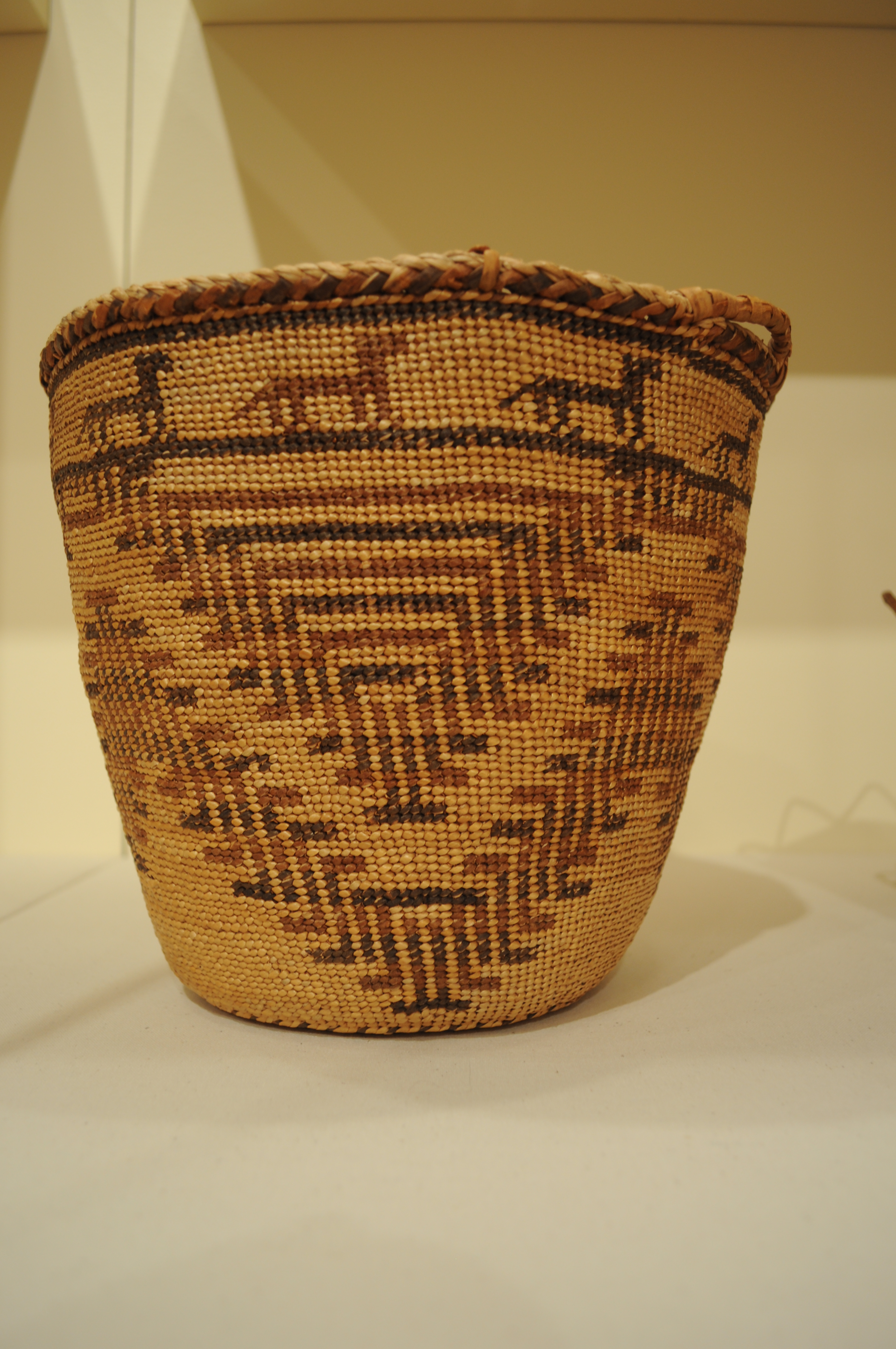
- Skokomish twined basket of red cedar bark, bear grass, cattail leaf, ca. 1890

Total population
- 796 enrolled members

Regions with significant populations
- United States (Washington)

Languages
- English, Twana

Religion
- traditional tribal religion

Related ethnic groups
- other Twana, Klallam, and Chimakum people

The Skokomish Indian Tribe (Twana: squqəʔbəš) (Note: Formerly known as the Skokomish Indian Tribe of the Skokomish Reservation, and in its own official use the Skokomish Tribal Nation) is a federally recognized tribe of Skokomish, Twana, Klallam, and Chimakum people. They are a tribe of Southern Coast Salish indigenous people of the Pacific Northwest located in Washington. The Skokomish are one of nine bands of Twana people.

== Reservation ==
Location of Skokomish Reservation

The Skokomish Reservation is located on several square miles of Mason County, just north of Shelton, Washington at 47°20′05″N 123°09′36″W. Some Klallam people were relocated onto the reservation after signing the 1855 Point No Point Treaty.

== Government ==
The Skokomish Indian Tribe is headquartered in Skokomish, Washington. The tribe is governed by a seven-member, democratically elected General Council. The current tribal administration is as follows:

- Chairman: Charles "Guy" Miller
- Vice-chair: Terri Twiddy-Butler
- Secretary: Alex Gouley
- Council Member: Lyle Wilbur
- Council Member: Tim "Wiggs" LeClair
- Council Member: Annette Smith
- Council Member: Tom Strong
- General Council President: Gilanne "Sissy" Delacruz
- Executive Secretary: Bobbi Blacketer

== Language ==
English is commonly spoken by members of the tribe. The Skokomish language is a dialect of Twana, a Central Salish language. The last fully fluent speaker died in 1980.

== Economic development ==
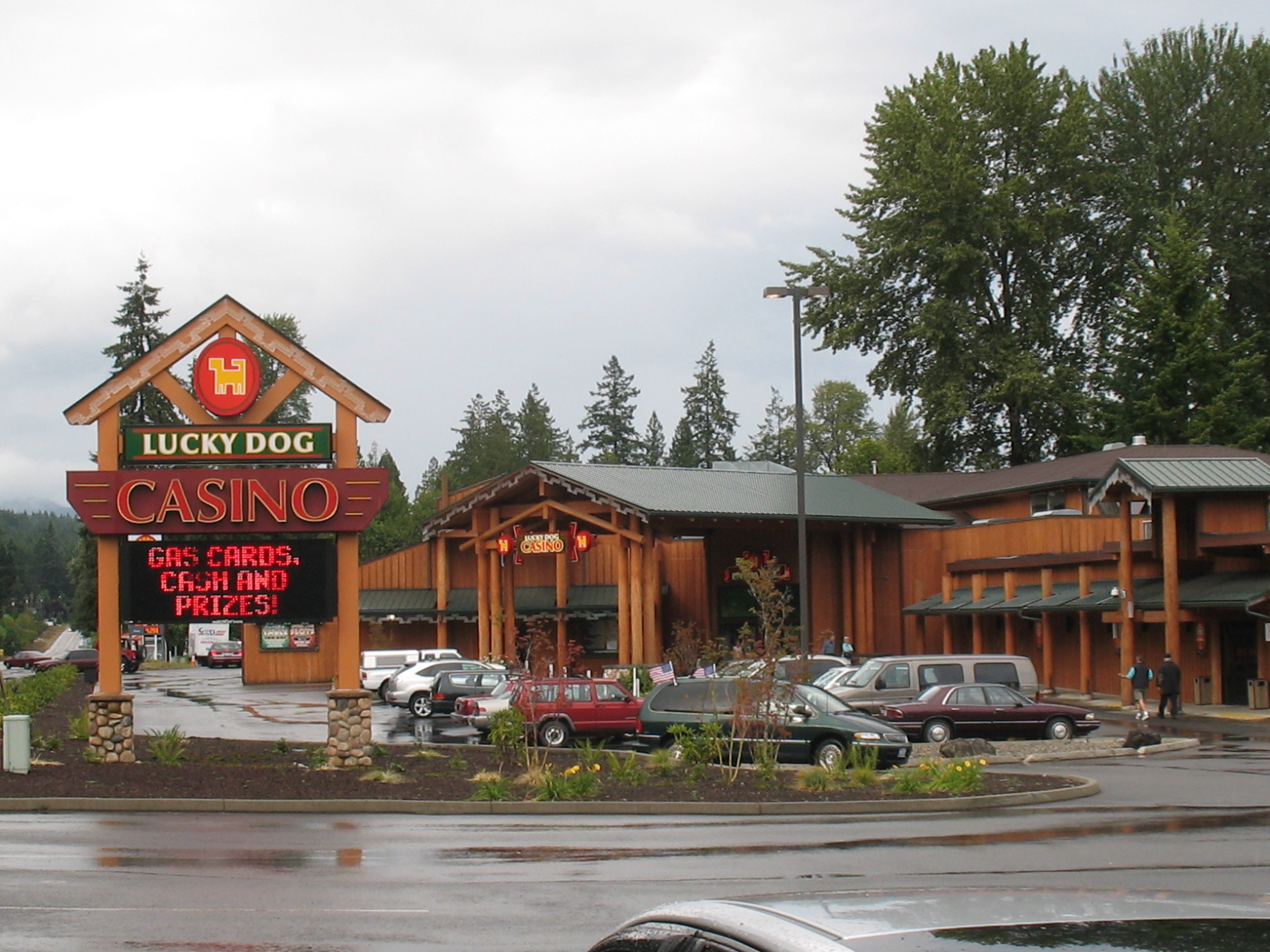
Lucky Dog Casino, Skokomish, Washington

As of April 2015, the Skokomish Tribe acquired the Glen Ayr resort, located north of Hoodsport, WA, along the Hood Canal.
