= Cushman Dam No. 1 =

- Cushman No. 1 Hydroelectric Power Plant
- U.S. National Register of Historic Places
- U.S. Historic district
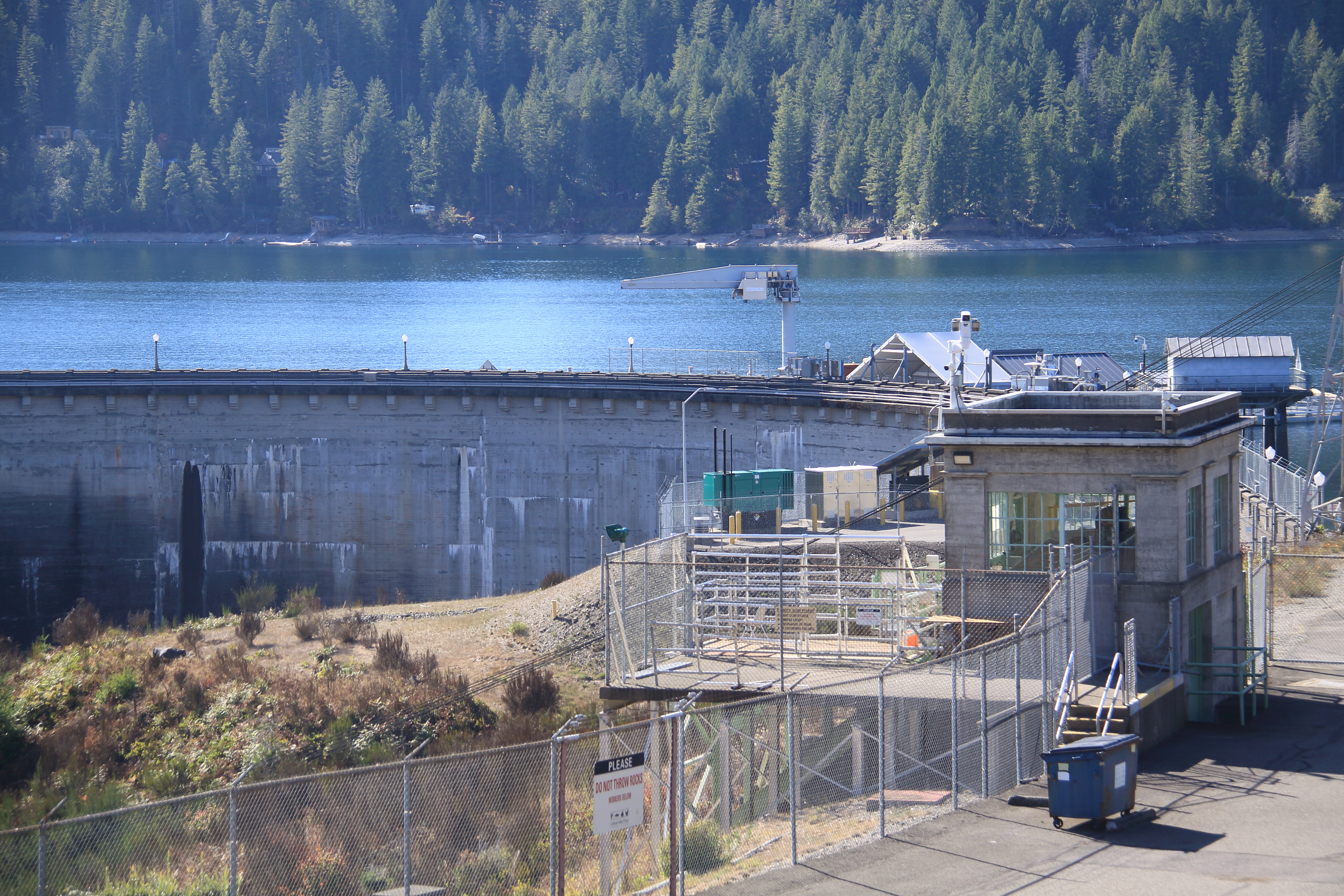

- Location within Washington (state) Location within the United States
- Location: Mason County, Washington, USA
- Nearest city: Hoodsport, Washington
- Coordinates: 47°25′23″N 123°13′21″W
- Area: 28 acres (11 ha)
- Built: 1923-1926
- Built by: Guthrie & Company
- Engineer: J. L. Stannard
- Architectural style: Neo Classical
- MPS: Hydroelectric Power Plants in Washington State, 1890--1938 MPS
- NRHP reference No.: 88002759
- Added to NRHP: December 15, 1988

Cushman Dam No. 1 is a hydroelectric dam on the North Fork of the Skokomish River in Mason County, Washington, which impounds and enlarges the naturally occurring Lake Cushman. Built by Tacoma City Light (now Tacoma Power) between 1923 –1926 as Tacoma's demand for electricity grew rapidly after World War I. Tacoma City Light's Nisqually River Hydroelectric Project, built in 1912, could not meet the demand and the utility decided to build a new hydroelectric project on the North Fork Skokomish River. The dam and powerhouse first began to deliver electricity on March 23, 1926. It has a concrete arch design and includes 90,000 cubic yards (69,000 m^{3}) of concrete, covering a whole 6,244 feet (1,903 m) of water.

Construction of the development began by May 23, 1923, with the construction of an incline tram under the commissioner Ira S. Davisson. It has a top width of eight feet (2.4 m) and a base width of 50 feet (15 m), at 275 feet (84 m) high and 1,111 feet (339 m) long. The transmission of electricity to Tacoma, over lines crossing Tacoma Narrows, was dedicated on May 24, 1926, with the push of a button by President Calvin Coolidge in a ceremony at the White House. Although there was a fanciful claim by Davisson later that U.S. President Coolidge "touched the key" that "sent current pulsing from Washington, D.C. into the Olympic Mountains and set the huge turbines whirring", the current generated was not sent from Washington, D.C., and plant was in operation for two months before President Coolidge (on May 24) pressed a "special key" button at the White House to signal the official opening and celebration. The generation of electricity on March 23, 1926, had been started "without ceremony or celebration" and residents of Tacoma were "unaware that the generation of power from the Cushman project had been realized". A contemporary account noted that Davisson and superintendent Alvin F. Darland "threw the switches and made the connections which sent the mighty pulsations of electrical power speeding over the cables of the 42-mile transmission line into Tacoma." A second, smaller dam, Cushman Dam No. 2, 3.2 kilometers (2.0 miles) downstream of Dam No. 1, was completed by December 1930.

== Hydroelectric power capacity ==
Generator	Nameplate Capacity (MW)
21	21.6
22	21.6
Total	43.2

== See also ==
- Cushman Dam No. 2
- National Register of Historic Places listings in Mason County, Washington
