= Point No Point Treaty =

1855 treaty between American settlers of the Washington Territory and local tribes

- Signed: January 26, 1855
- Location: Northern tip of the Kitsap Peninsula
- Parties: Washington Territory; S'Klallam; Chimakum; Skokomish

The Point No Point Treaty was signed on January 26, 1855, at Point No Point, on the northern tip of the Kitsap Peninsula. Governor of Washington Territory, Isaac Stevens, convened the treaty council on January 25, with the S'Klallam, the Chimakum, and the Skokomish tribes. Under the terms of the treaty, the original inhabitants of northern Kitsap Peninsula and Olympic Peninsula ceded ownership of their land in exchange for small reservations along Hood Canal and a payment of $60,000 from the federal government. The treaty required the natives to trade only with the United States, to free all their slaves, and to not acquire any new slaves.

On the first day of the council, treaty provisions were translated from English to the Chinook Jargon for the 1,200 natives who assembled at the sand spit they called Hahdskus, across Admiralty Inlet from Whidbey Island. Today this is the site of a lighthouse.

Skokomish leader Hool-hol-tan expressed concern about finding sufficient food in the new locations, and did not like the lands being offered as a reservation. L'Hau-at-scha-uk, a To-antioch, was afraid he would die if he left his ancestral lands. Others objected that the land was being bought too cheaply, now that they understood what it was worth. The whites played down the importance of the land, but the first day ended without an agreement.

But by the next morning, the various chiefs and headmen returned under white flags to add their marks to the treaty. It had already been prepared by the United States representatives in its final form; they had no intention of using it as a basis for negotiations.
