= Lake Kokanee =

- Location within Washington (state) Location within the United States
- Location: Mason County, Washington, United States
- Coordinates: 47°23′51″N 123°12′05″W
- Lake type: reservoir
- Primary inflows: Skokomish River
- Primary outflows: Skokomish River
- Basin countries: United States
- Surface area: 150 acres (61 ha)
- Surface elevation: 484 ft (148 m)

Lake Kokanee, also known as Lower Lake Cushman, is a 150-acre (607,000 m^{2}) reservoir on the North Fork of the Skokomish River in Mason County, Washington. The lake is maintained by Cushman Dam No. 2, providing electrical power to the Tacoma Power system.

== See also ==
- Kokanee (disambiguation)
