= Skokomish, Washington =

- CDP
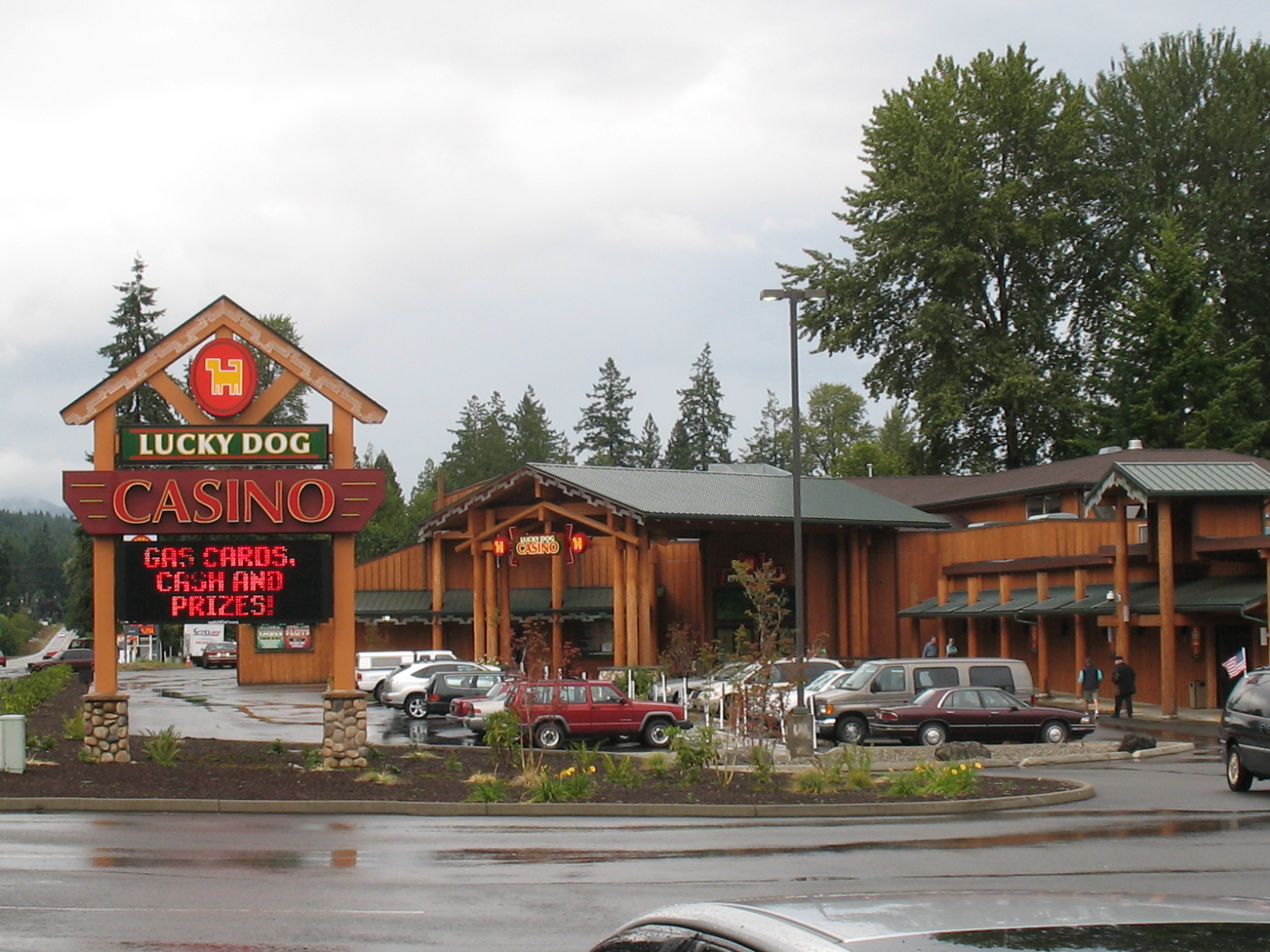
- The Lucky Dog Casino of the Skokomish Tribe

- Location of Skokomish, Washington
- Coordinates: 47°19′56″N 123°08′19″W
- Country: United States
- State: Washington
- County: Mason

Area
  - Total: 6.9 sq mi (17.8 km^{2})
  - Land: 6.6 sq mi (17.2 km^{2})
  - Water: 0.23 sq mi (0.6 km^{2})
- Elevation: 23 ft (7.0 m)

Population (2020)
  - Total: 615
  - Density: 92.6/sq mi (35.8/km^{2})
- Time zone: UTC-8 (Pacific (PST))
  - Summer (DST): UTC-7 (PDT)
- ZIP Code: 98584
- Area code(s): 360, 564
- FIPS code: 53-64775
- GNIS feature ID: 2408744

Skokomish is a census-designated place (CDP) in Mason County, Washington, United States. As of the 2020 census, Skokomish had a population of 615. The town is the headquarters of the Skokomish Indian Tribe.

== Geography ==
According to the United States Census Bureau, the CDP has a total area of 6.9 square miles (18 km^{2}), of which, 6.7 square miles (17 km^{2}) of it is land and 0.2 square miles (0.52 km^{2}) of it (3.20%) is water.

== Demographics ==
Historical population
| Census | Pop. | Note | %± |
|---|---|---|---|
| 2000 | 616 | | — |
| 2010 | 617 | | 0.2% |
| 2020 | 615 | | −0.3% |

As of the census of 2000, there were 616 people, 186 households, and 153 families residing in the CDP. The population density was 92.5 people per square mile (35.7 people/km^{2}). There were 195 housing units at an average density of 29.3 units per square mile (11.3 units/km^{2}). The racial makeup of the CDP was 19.16% White, 78.90% Native American, 0.16% Asian, 0.32% from other races, and 1.46% from two or more races. Hispanic or Latino of any race were 2.27% of the population.

There were 186 households, out of which 49.5% had children under the age of 18 living with them, 43.0% were married couples living together, 21.5% had a female householder with no husband present, and 17.7% were non-families. 12.4% of all households were made up of individuals, and 3.2% had someone living alone who was 65 years of age or older. The average household size was 3.31 and the average family size was 3.42.

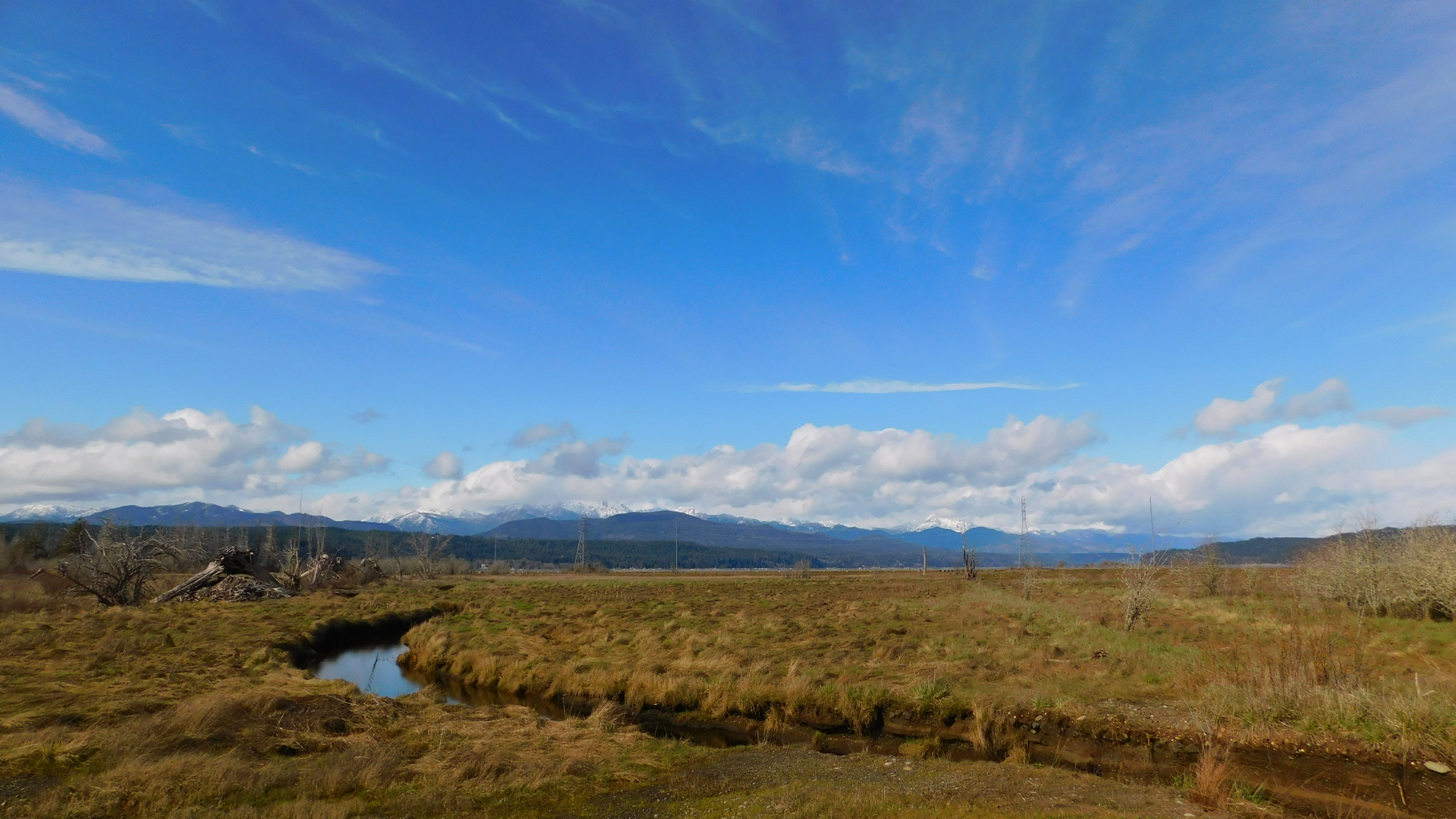
Skokomish Estuary, 2025

In the CDP, the population was spread out, with 38.1% under the age of 18, 8.1% from 18 to 24, 28.6% from 25 to 44, 18.3% from 45 to 64, and 6.8% who were 65 years of age or older. The median age was 28 years. For every 100 females, there were 103.3 males. For every 100 females age 18 and over, there were 109.3 males.

The median income for a household in the CDP was $24,038, and the median income for a family was $26,563. Males had a median income of $23,750 versus $25,125 for females. The per capita income for the CDP was $9,548. About 26.6% of families and 29.3% of the population were below the poverty line, including 27.3% of those under age 18 and 10.6% of those age 65 or over.
