= Twana language =

Extinct Salishan language of Washington

Twana
- Skokomish
- tuwaduq
- Native to: United States
- Region: Puget Sound, precisely Hood Canal, Washington state
- Ethnicity: 350 Twana (1977)
- Extinct: 1980
- Revival: 2010s
- Language family: Salishan: Coast Salish; Central; Twana
- Writing system: NAPA

Language codes
- ISO 639-3: twa
- Glottolog: twan1247

The Twana (tuwaduq) language, also known as Skokomish, is a Coast Salish language of the Salishan language family, spoken by the Twana, the Indigenous people of Hood Canal, in Washington. The name "Skokomish" is an Anglicization of the Twana word squqəʔbəš and means "river people" or "people of the river".

== History ==
It is believed by some elders within the Skokomish community (such as Bruce Subiyay Miller) that the language branched off from Lushootseed (a neighboring related Coast Salish language) because of the region-wide tradition of not speaking the name of someone who died for a year after their death. Substitute words were found in their place and often became normalizing in the community, generating differences from one community to the next. Subiyay speculated that this process increased the drift rate between languages and separated Twana firmly from Lushootseed.

The last fluent speaker died in 1980. The Skokomish Indian Tribe released an online Twana dictionary in 2020, and the language is currently being revived.

== Phonology ==
Consonants
		Bilabial	Alveolar			Palatal	Velar		Uvular		Glottal
		Bilabial	median	sibilant	lateral	Palatal	plain	lab.	plain	lab.	Glottal
Plosive/ Affricate	plain	p	t	ts		tʃ	k	kʷ	q	qʷ	ʔ
Plosive/ Affricate	ejective	pʼ	tʼ	tsʼ	tɬʼ	tʃʼ	kʼ	kʷʼ	qʼ	qʷʼ	
Plosive/ Affricate	voiced	b	d	d͡z (Note: Found in loan words.)		d͡ʒ	ɡ	ɡʷ			
Fricative				s	ɬ	ʃ	x (Note: The sound [x] is disputed to be a main sound.)	xʷ	χ	χʷ	h
Sonorant	plain	m	n		l	j		w			
Sonorant	glottalized	ˀm			ˀl	ˀj		ˀw			

Vowel sounds present are [e ɛ ə o a].

== See also ==
- Lushootseed
