= Skokomish people =

North American tribe

Coordinates: 47°20′05″N 123°09′36″W

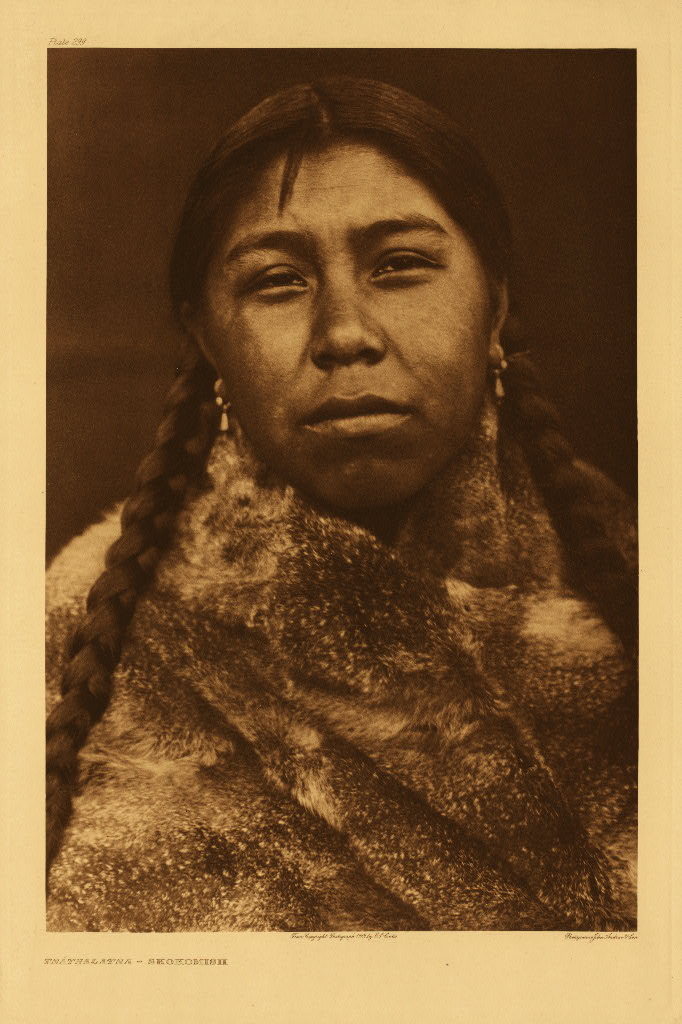
Tsatsalatsa - Skokomish by Edward S. Curtis, 1913

The Skokomish (pronounced /skoʊˈkoʊmɪʃ/, Twana: squqəʔbəš) are one of nine tribes of the Twana, a Native American people of western Washington state in the United States. The tribe lives along Hood Canal, a fjord-like inlet on the west side of the Kitsap Peninsula and the Puget Sound basin. Historically the Twana were hunters, fishers, and gatherers who had a nomadic lifestyle during the warmer months, while living in more permanent homes during the winter months.

Today, Skokomish people are enrolled in the federally recognized Skokomish Indian Tribe.

== Name ==
The name "Skokomish" comes from the Twana sqʷuqʷóbəš, also spelled sqWuqWu'b3sH, and meaning "river people" or "people of the river". The Skokomish were one of the largest of the nine different Twana village communities that existed before about 1860. By their locations, the nine groups were the Dabop, Quilcene ("salt-water people"), Dosewallips, Duckabush, Hoodsport, Skokomish (Skoko'bsh), Ctqwəlqweli ("Vance Creek"), Tahuya, and Duhlelap (Tule'lalap) communities. Within these nine communities there were at least 33 settlements.

== Language ==
The Skokomish, or Twana language belongs to the Coast Salish family of indigenous languages.

== Reservation ==
The tribe moved onto the Skokomish Indian Reservation in the central part of modern-day Mason County, Washington at the southeast base of the Olympic Peninsula around 1855. The reservation has a land area of 21.244 km^{2} (8.2022 sq mi) and a 2000 census resident population of 730 persons. Its major community is Skokomish. The nearest outside communities are Union, to its east, and Hoodsport, to its north.

== History ==
In 1855, the Skokomish signed the Treaty of Point No Point with representatives of the United States government. Under the terms of the treaty, the Skokomish and neighboring tribes, including the Chemakum and S'Klallam, ceded most of their traditional territories in exchange for reserved land, fishing rights, and limited federal protection. Following the treaty, the Skokomish were relocated to the area that would later become the Skokomish Indian Reservation along the Skokomish River.

By the late nineteenth century, many Skokomish families faced pressure to abandon traditional fishing and spiritual practices due to U.S. assimilation policies and the introduction of boarding schools. Despite these challenges, the tribe maintained much of its cultural identity, especially through fishing and communal gatherings along the Hood Canal.

== Culture ==
Traditional Skokomish life centered around fishing, particularly salmon, which held both economic and spiritual significance. Cedar played a vital role in daily life; cedar bark and roots were used to make mats, clothing, ropes, and baskets, while canoes and longhouses were carved from large cedar logs. Basketry was highly developed, often incorporating intricate twined designs unique to the Twana peoples.

The Skokomish practiced the Coast Salish tradition of the potlatch, a ceremonial event that included feasting, dancing, singing, and the giving of gifts to reaffirm social bonds and status. Potlatches marked major life events such as marriages, inheritance, and memorials.

Spiritual beliefs were closely tied to the natural world, emphasizing respect for the salmon, cedar, and river—the sources of life. Many traditional stories and songs reflected these relationships and were passed down orally through generations.

== Environmental challenges ==
In recent decades, the Skokomish Tribe has documented significant environmental changes affecting traditional fishing areas in the lower Hood Canal, particularly in Anna’s Bay. Studies have shown that declining dissolved oxygen levels in the canal have contributed to reduced harvests of spot shrimp, an important traditional and subsistence resource for the Skokomish people.

Researchers have linked the hypoxia (low oxygen) to nutrient runoff, septic leakage, and algae blooms resulting from land use changes in the surrounding watershed. The Skokomish Tribe has participated in regional restoration efforts to improve water quality and revive the spot shrimp population, combining traditional ecological knowledge with modern environmental science.
