= National Register of Historic Places listings in Kitsap County, Washington =

Location of Kitsap County in Washington

This is a list of the National Register of Historic Places listings in Kitsap County, Washington.

This is intended to be a complete list of the properties and districts on the National Register of Historic Places in Kitsap County, Washington, United States. Latitude and longitude coordinates are provided for many National Register properties and districts; these locations may be seen together in a map.

There are 22 properties and districts listed on the National Register in the county. Another property was once listed but has been removed.

This National Park Service list is complete through NPS recent listings posted August 21, 2026.

== Current listings ==
	Name on the Register	Image	Date listed	Location	City or town	Description
1	Agate Pass Bridge	Agate Pass Bridge	May 24, 1995 (#95000625)	WA 305 over Agate Passage; 47°42′45″N 122°33′54″W	Suquamish	Built in 1950. Bridges of Washington State MPS
2	Bremerton Elks Temple Lodge No. 1181 Building	Bremerton Elks Temple Lodge No. 1181 Building	March 3, 1995 (#95000192)	285 Fifth St. 47°34′00″N 122°37′31″W	Bremerton	
3	Camp Major Hopkins	Camp Major Hopkins	November 30, 2005 (#05001351)	900 Park Ave. NE; 47°37′58″N 122°29′43″W	Bainbridge Island	Built in 1935. Currently known as Camp Yeomalt.
4	Coder-Coleman House	Coder-Coleman House	May 28, 2009 (#09000367)	904 Highland Ave. 47°34′11″N 122°37′28″W	Bremerton	
5	Doe-Kag-Wats	Doe-Kag-Wats	June 17, 2019 (#100004076)	10435 NE Shore Dr. 47°44′42″N 122°30′15″W	Kingston	
6	Filipino-American Community Hall	Filipino-American Community Hall	March 20, 1995 (#95000193)	7566 NE High School Rd. 47°38′11″N 122°33′09″W	Bainbridge Island	Built in 1930.
7	Fort Ward Historic District	Fort Ward Historic District	January 12, 1978 (#78002759)	S of Winslow; 47°34′52″N 122°31′42″W	Bainbridge Island	Built in 1890.
8	Hall Brothers Marine Railway & Shipbuilding Co. House		June 22, 2026 (#100013174)	761 Winslow Way East; 47°37′29″N 122°30′43″W	Bainbridge Island	
9	Hospital Reservation Historic District	Hospital Reservation Historic District	July 16, 1990 (#88003052)	Roughly bounded by Mahan Ave., Hoogewerf Rd., Decatur Ave., and Dewey St. 47°33′44″N 122°38′38″W	Bremerton	
10	Jackson Hall Memorial Community Hall	Jackson Hall Memorial Community Hall	August 22, 1995 (#95001036)	9161 Washington Ave. 47°38′44″N 122°40′50″W	Silverdale	Also known as Silverdale Scout Hall.
11	Marine Reservation Historic District	Marine Reservation Historic District	July 16, 1990 (#88003051)	Bounded by Cole St., Dewey St., Decatur Ave., and Doyen St. 47°33′48″N 122°38′43″W	Bremerton	
12	Masonic Hall-Port Orchard	Masonic Hall-Port Orchard	May 10, 2010 (#10000254)	202 Sidney Ave. 47°32′28″N 122°38′12″W	Port Orchard	
13	Navy Yard Puget Sound	Navy Yard Puget Sound	August 27, 1992 (#92001883)	N shore of Sinclair Inlet; 47°33′32″N 122°38′17″W	Bremerton	This shipyard was the primary repair destination for damaged battleships during World War II. Of the eight ships bombed in the Japanese attack on Pearl Harbor, five were repaired here.
14	Charles F. Nelson House	Charles F. Nelson House	August 28, 1973 (#73001879)	Corner of Nelson and Crescent Valley Rds. 47°25′06″N 122°32′25″W	Olalla	
15	Officers' Row Historic District	Officers' Row Historic District	July 16, 1990 (#88003054)	Roughly bounded by Mahan Ave., Decatur Ave., and Coghlan Rd. 47°33′44″N 122°38′20″W	Bremerton	
16	Old-Man-House Site (45KP2)	Old-Man-House Site (45KP2)	January 12, 1990 (#89002299)	Address Restricted	Suquamish	
17	Point No Point Light	Point No Point Light	August 10, 1978 (#78002758)	E of Hansville; 47°54′45″N 122°31′32″W	Hansville	Built in 1879.
18	Port Gamble Historic District	Port Gamble Historic District	November 13, 1966 (#66000746)	NW end of Kitsap Peninsula near entrance to Hood Canal, Puget Sound; 47°51′18″N 122°35′02″W	Port Gamble	This company town was founded in 1853, and ran the longest running timber mill in the US, which just closed in 1995. Seattle architect Charles Bebb designed many of the town's buildings.
19	Puget Sound Radio Station Historic District	Puget Sound Radio Station Historic District	July 16, 1990 (#88003053)	Roughly bounded by Mahan Ave., Coghlan Rd., and Cottman Rd. 47°33′48″N 122°38′23″W	Bremerton	
20	Shelbanks	Shelbanks	March 10, 2004 (#04000160)	1520 Shorewood Dr. 47°34′33″N 122°40′53″W	Bremerton	Also known as Kean Cabin.
21	US Post Office-Bremerton Main	US Post Office-Bremerton Main	August 7, 1991 (#91000638)	602 Pacific Ave. 47°34′04″N 122°37′31″W	Bremerton	
22	Yama & Nagaya Village	Yama & Nagaya Village	May 7, 2018 (#100002393)	Address Restricted	Bainbridge Island	

== Former listing ==
	Name on the Register	Image	Date listed	Date removed	Location	City or town	Description
1	Hotel Sidney		March 1, 1973 (#73001880)	October 7, 1985	700 Prospect St.	Port Orchard	Also known as Navy View Apartments. Destroyed by arsonist on July 11, 1985. Replica stands on original foundation.
