= National Register of Historic Places listings in Mason County, Washington =

Location of Mason County in Washington

This list presents the full set of buildings, structures, objects, sites, or districts designated on the National Register of Historic Places in Mason County, Washington, and offers brief descriptive information about each of them. The National Register recognizes places of national, state, or local historic significance across the United States. Out of over 90,000 National Register sites nationwide, Washington is home to approximately 1,500, and 18 of those are found in Mason County.

This National Park Service list is complete through NPS recent listings posted August 7, 2026.

== Current listings ==
	Name on the Register	Image	Date listed	Location	City or town	Description
1	Big Creek Archeological Site-45MS100		October 13, 1999 (#99001219)	Address Restricted	Hoodsport	
2	Cushman Hydroelectric Project Historic District	Cushman Hydroelectric Project Historic District	February 2, 2015 (#14001244)	21451 N. U.S. 101; 47°22′19″N 123°09′44″W	Hoodsport	
3	Cushman No. 1 Hydroelectric Power Plant	Cushman No. 1 Hydroelectric Power Plant	December 15, 1988 (#88002759)	South end of Lake Cushman; 47°25′23″N 123°13′21″W	Hoodsport	
4	Cushman No. 2 Hydroelectric Power Plant	Cushman No. 2 Hydroelectric Power Plant	December 15, 1988 (#88002757)	Skokomish River; 47°22′59″N 123°10′42″W	Hoodsport	
5	Ebenezer Congregational Church	Ebenezer Congregational Church	September 13, 2018 (#100002940)	18500 WA 3; 47°23′03″N 122°49′43″W	Allyn	
6	Goldsborough Creek Bridge	Goldsborough Creek Bridge	July 16, 1982 (#82004264)	WA 3; 47°12′34″N 123°05′57″W	Shelton	Historic Bridges and Tunnels in Washington TR
7	Harstine Island Community Hall	Harstine Island Community Hall	March 16, 1989 (#89000212)	North Island Dr. and Hartstene Island Dr. 47°16′35″N 122°53′10″W	Harstine Island	
8	High Steel Bridge	High Steel Bridge	July 16, 1982 (#82004265)	Spans Skokomish South Fork; 47°22′05″N 123°16′44″W	Shelton	Historic Bridges and Tunnels in Washington TR
9	Malaney–O'Neill House	Malaney–O'Neill House	January 23, 2013 (#12001222)	1570 E. Agate Bay Road; 47°14′49″N 123°00′46″W	Shelton vicinity	
10	Mason County Courthouse	Mason County Courthouse	January 9, 2013 (#12001160)	419 N. 4th St. 47°12′57″N 123°06′13″W	Shelton	
11	North Hamma Hamma River Bridge	North Hamma Hamma River Bridge	July 16, 1982 (#82004262)	Spans North Hamma Hamma River; 47°32′23″N 123°02′33″W	Eldon	Historic Bridges and Tunnels in Washington TR
12	Shelton Public Library and Town Hall	Shelton Public Library and Town Hall	July 14, 1983 (#83003348)	5th St. and Railroad Ave. 47°12′48″N 123°06′11″W	Shelton	
13	Schafer State Park	Schafer State Park	May 10, 2010 (#10000255)	1365 W Schafer Park Rd. 47°05′59″N 123°28′21″W	Elma	
14	Simpson Logging Company Locomotive No. 7 and Peninsular Railway Caboose No. 700	Simpson Logging Company Locomotive No. 7 and Peninsular Railway Caboose No. 700	January 12, 1984 (#84003532)	3rd and Railroad Aves. 47°12′47″N 123°06′03″W	Shelton	
15	South Hamma Hamma River Bridge	South Hamma Hamma River Bridge	July 16, 1982 (#82004263)	Spans South Hamma Hamma River; 47°32′11″N 123°02′28″W	Eldon	Historic Bridges and Tunnels in Washington TR
16	taba das	taba das	February 16, 2005 (#05000066)	Address Restricted	Potlatch	
17	Twanoh State Park	Twanoh State Park	September 10, 2014 (#14000614)	1290 E. WA 106; 47°22′27″N 122°58′25″W	Union	
18	Vance Creek Bridge	Vance Creek Bridge	July 16, 1982 (#82004266)	Northwest of Shelton; 47°20′06″N 123°19′10″W	Shelton	Historic Bridges and Tunnels in Washington TR

== See also ==
- National Register of Historic Places listings in Washington state
- Listings in neighboring counties: Grays Harbor, Jefferson, Kitsap, Pierce, Thurston
- Historic preservation
- History of Washington (state)
- Index of Washington (state)-related articles
