= Puget Sound Naval Shipyard =

US Navy shipyard in Bremerton, Washington

Puget Sound Naval Shipyard and Intermediate Maintenance Facility
- Puget Sound, Washington
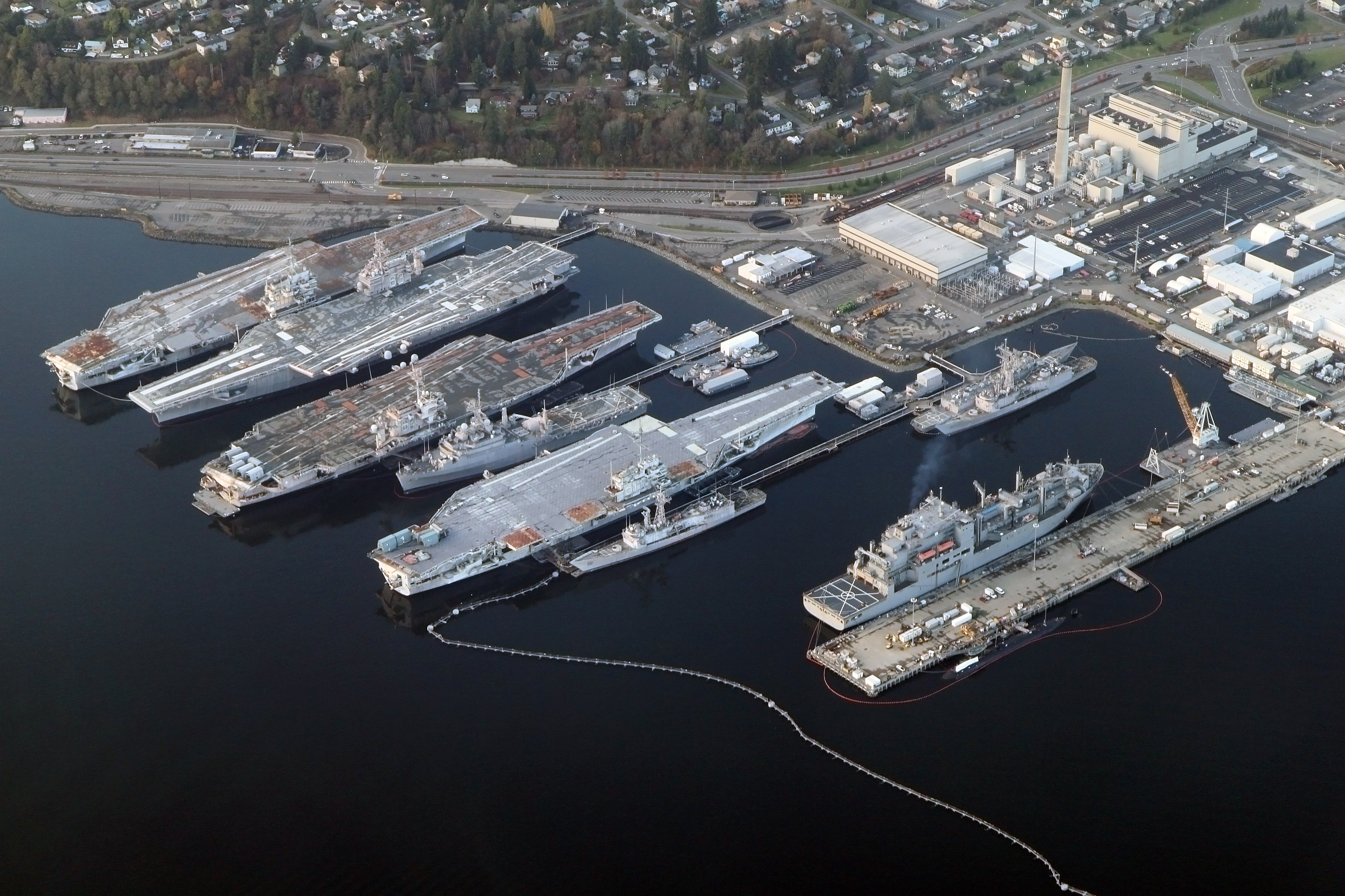
- An aerial view of the Puget Sound Naval Shipyard and Intermediate Maintenance Facility in Bremerton, Washington (USA), on 24 November 2012. Visible are the following ships (top to bottom): aircraft carrier USS Independence (CV-62); USS Kitty Hawk (CV-63); USS Constellation (CV-64); amphibious transport dock ship USS Dubuque (LPD-8); USS Ranger (CV-61); three Oliver Hazard Perry-class frigates; an (active) Lewis and Clark-class dry cargo ship; a Seawolf-class submarine.

Site information
- Type: Shipyard
- Controlled by: United States Navy

Site history
- Built: 1891
- In use: 1891–present

Garrison information
- Current commander: CAPT William Sumsion (2026-present)

Puget Sound Naval Shipyard, officially Puget Sound Naval Shipyard and Intermediate Maintenance Facility (PSNS & IMF), is a United States Navy shipyard covering 179 acres (0.7 km^{2}) on Puget Sound at Bremerton, Washington, in uninterrupted use since its establishment in 1891; it has also been known as Navy Yard Puget Sound, Bremerton Navy Yard, and the Bremerton Naval Complex.

It is bordered on the south by Sinclair Inlet, on the west by the Bremerton Annex of Naval Base Kitsap, and on the north and east by the city of Bremerton, Washington. It is the Pacific Northwest's largest naval shore facility and one of Washington state's largest industrial installations. PSNS & IMF provides the Navy with maintenance, modernization, and technical and logistics support, and employs 15,000 people which makes it the largest public shipyard in the US in terms of personnel assigned.

== History ==
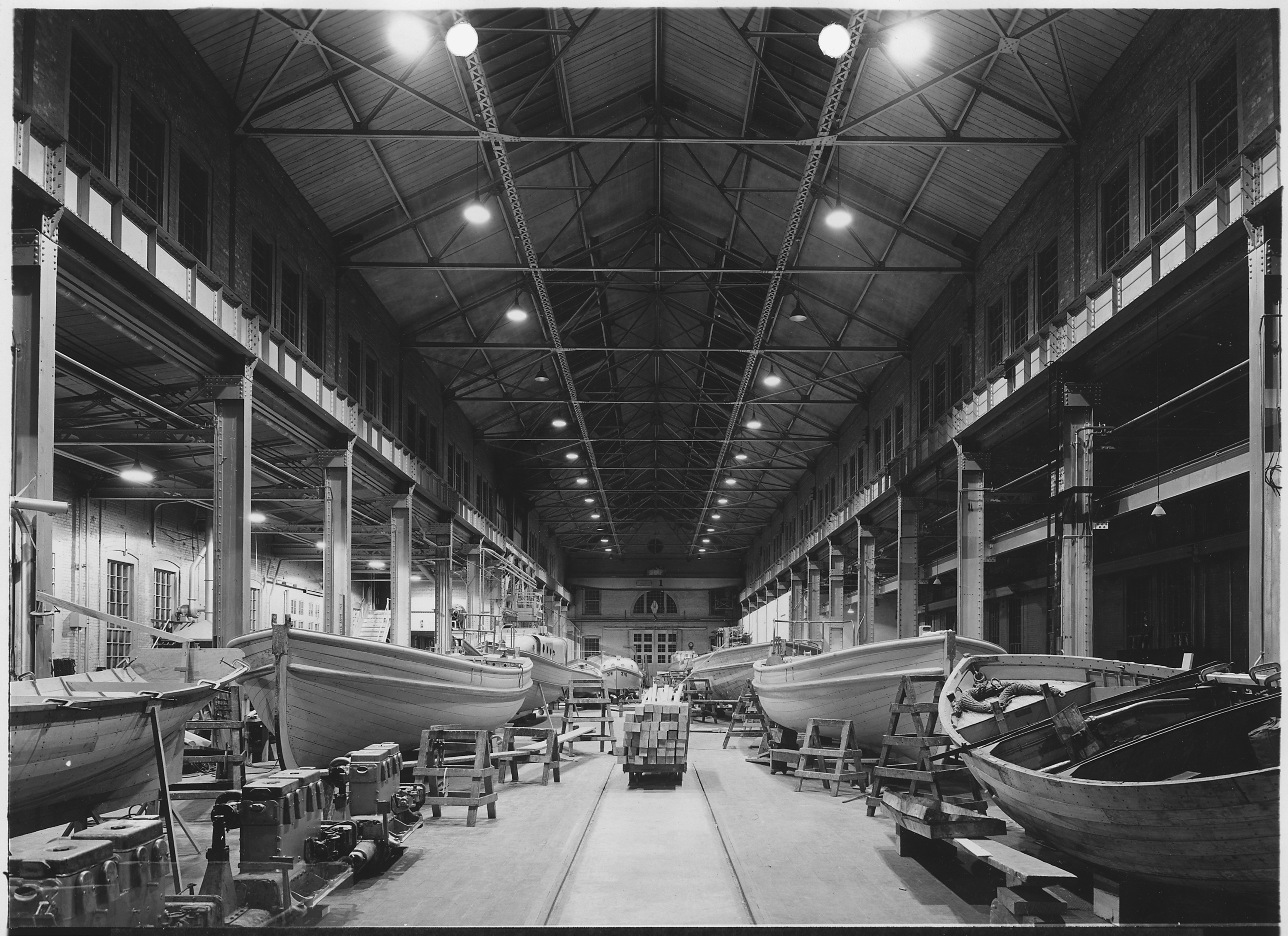
Interior of Building 108 in 1936

Puget Sound Naval Shipyard was established in 1891 as a Naval Station and was designated Navy Yard Puget Sound in 1901. During World War I, the Navy Yard constructed ships, including 25 subchasers, seven submarines, two minesweepers, seven seagoing tugs, and two ammunition ships, as well as 1,700 small boats. During World War II, the shipyard's primary effort was the repair of battle damage to ships of the U.S. fleet and those of its allies.

Following World War II, Navy Yard Puget Sound was designated Puget Sound Naval Shipyard. It engaged in an extensive program of modernizing carriers, including converting conventional flight decks to angle decks. During the Korean War, the shipyard was engaged in the activation of ships. In the late 1950s, it entered an era of new construction with the building of a new class of guided missile frigates. In 1965, USS Sculpin (SSN 590) became the first nuclear-powered submarine to be maintained at PSNS. The shipyard was designated a National Historic Landmark in 1992. The historic district includes 22 contributing buildings and 42 contributing structures, as well as 49 non-contributing buildings, structures, and objects.

== Installations ==
Perhaps the most visible feature of the shipyard is its green hammerhead crane, built in 1933. The PSNS hammerhead crane is 250 feet (76 m) tall and 80 feet (24 m) wide with a lifting capacity of 250 tons.

== Historic districts ==
The Puget Sound Naval Shipyard contains five historic districts:

1. Officers' Row Historic District;
2. Puget Sound Radio Station Historic District;
3. Hospital Reservation Historic District;
4. Puget Sound Naval Shipyard Historic District; and
5. Marine Reservation Historic District.

These five units are a comprehensive representation of the historic features of the naval shipyard.

== Dry Docks and Slipways ==
Dock No.	Material of which dock is constructed	Length	Width	Depth	Date Completed	Source
1	Concrete	638 feet 11 inches (194.74 m)	108 feet (33 m)	30 feet 2 inches (9.19 m)	1896	
2	Concrete and granite	867 feet (264 m)	145 feet (44 m)	38 feet 2 inches (11.63 m)	1911	
3	Concrete	926 feet 8 inches (282.45 m)	130 feet (40 m)	23 feet 8 inches (7.21 m)	1919	
4	Concrete	997 feet 10 inches (304.14 m)	147 feet (45 m)	45 feet 2 inches (13.77 m)	1940	
5	Concrete	1,030 feet 6 inches (314.10 m)	147 feet (45 m)	45 feet 2 inches (13.77 m)	1941	
6	Concrete	1,151 feet 11 inches (351.10 m)	180 feet (55 m)	53 feet 2 inches (16.21 m)	1962	

1 January 1946
Shipbuilding ways	Width	Length	Source
1 and 2	109 feet (33 m)	400 feet (120 m)	
3 and 4	109 feet (33 m)	400 feet (120 m)	

== Operations ==
=== Shipbuilding ===
- Heavy cruisers
  - 1 of 6 Northampton-class (built July 1928 - September 1930)
    - Louisville
  - 1 of 7 New Orleans-class (September 1930 - December 1933)
    - Astoria
- Destroyers
  - 1 of 8 Farragut-class (built December 1932 - October 1934)
    - Worden
  - 2 of 18 Mahan-class (August 1934 - December 1935)
    - Cushing
    - Perkins
  - 2 of 8 Bagley-class (July 1935 - May 1937)
    - Patterson
    - Jarvis
  - 1 of 8 Benham-class (March 1937 - April 1939)
    - Wilson
  - 1 of 30 Benson-class (January 1939 - May 1940)
    - Charles F. Hughes
  - 1 of 66 Gleaves-class (July 1939 - May 1940)
    - Monssen
  - 8 of 175 Fletcher-class (June 1941 - September 1944)
    - Halford
    - Leutze
    - Howorth
    - Killen
    - Hart
    - Metcalf
    - Shields
    - Wiley
- 8 of 65 Evarts-class destroyer escorts (September 1942 - August 1943)
  - USS Greiner (DE-37) ... USS Donaldson (DE-44)

=== Ship-Submarine Recycling Program ===
In 1990 the Navy authorized the Ship-Submarine Recycling Program (SRP) to recycle nuclear-powered ships at PSNS. Approximately 25% of the shipyard's workload involves inactivation, reactor compartment disposal, and recycling of ships. It has pioneered an environmentally safe method of deactivating and recycling nuclear-powered ships. This process places the U.S. Navy in the role of being the world's only organization to design, build, operate, and recycle nuclear-powered ships. On 15 May 2003 PSNS and IMF were consolidated into what is now known as PSNS & IMF.

PSNS is the only U.S. facility certified to recycle nuclear ships. During all this period Puget Sound Naval Shipyard has scrapped more than 125 submarines and some cruisers.

=== Reserve fleet ===
The shipyard contains a portion of the United States Navy reserve fleet, a large collection of inactive U.S. Navy vessels. The aircraft carrier USS Kitty Hawk (CV-63) was mothballed there until May 2022 when it was removed for scrapping.

== Environmental issues ==
Gorst Creek Ravine near Port Orchard, Washington was a hazardous waste dump for the Navy's shipyard waste between 1969 and 1970, when the site was not permitted by local authorities to take waste. After several collapses since 1997 the landfill could blow out Highway 3. The landfill is an "ongoing source of pesticides, polychlorinated biphenyls and metals flowing downstream with the potential to affect groundwater wells, sport fisheries and the Suquamish Tribe's fish hatchery." In October 2014, the US EPA ordered the Navy to fix the problems.

== Gallery ==
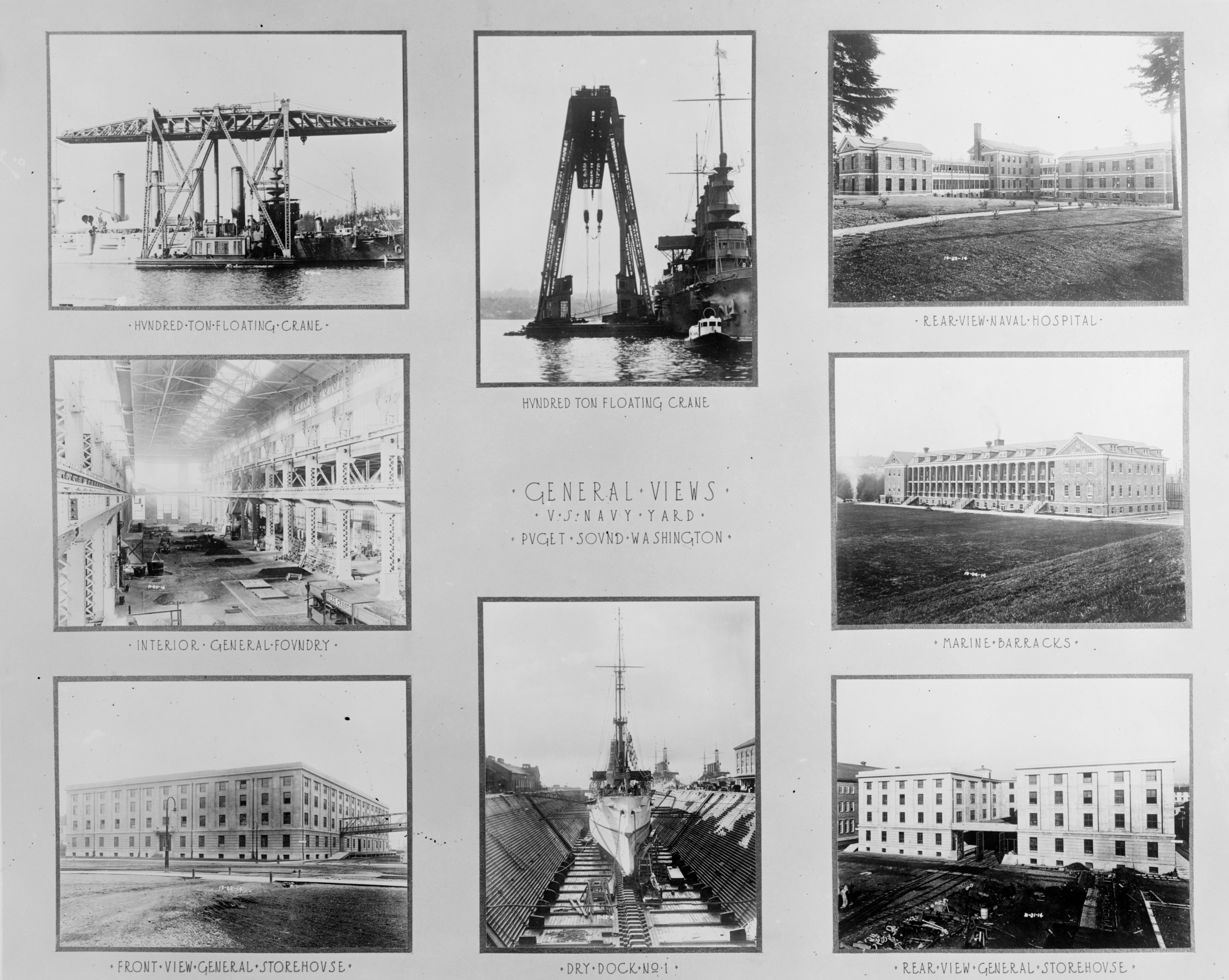
Navy Yard views in 1910

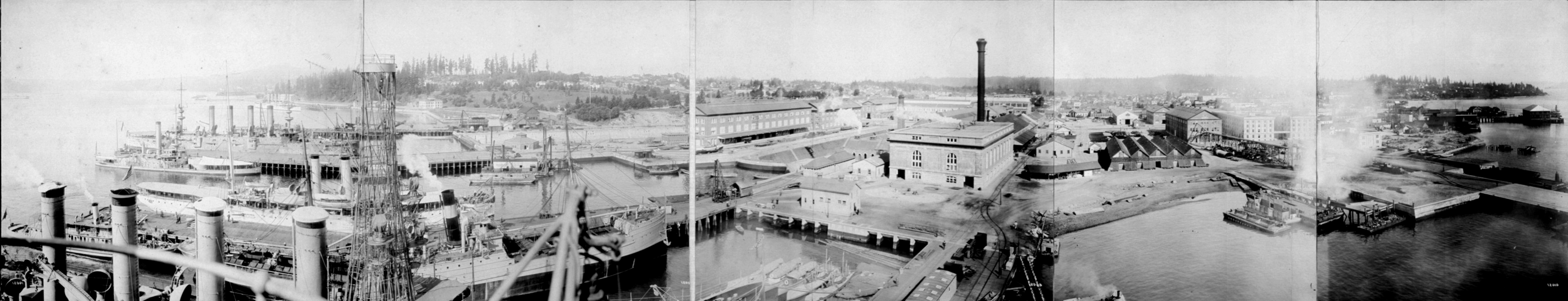
Puget Sound Navy Yard in 1913

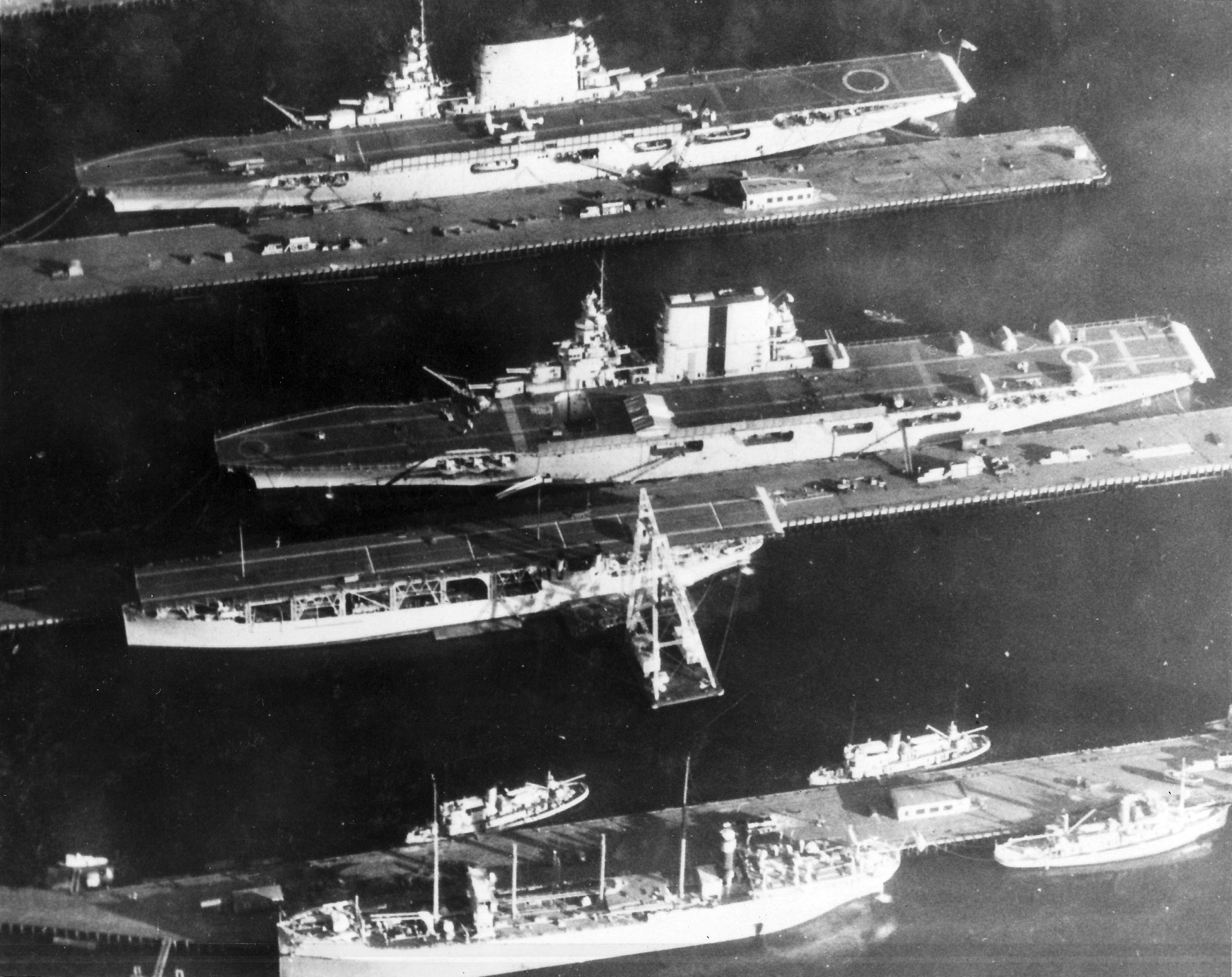
Aircraft carriers USS Langley (CV-1), USS Saratoga (CV-3), USS Lexington (CV-2) at Puget Sound, 1929

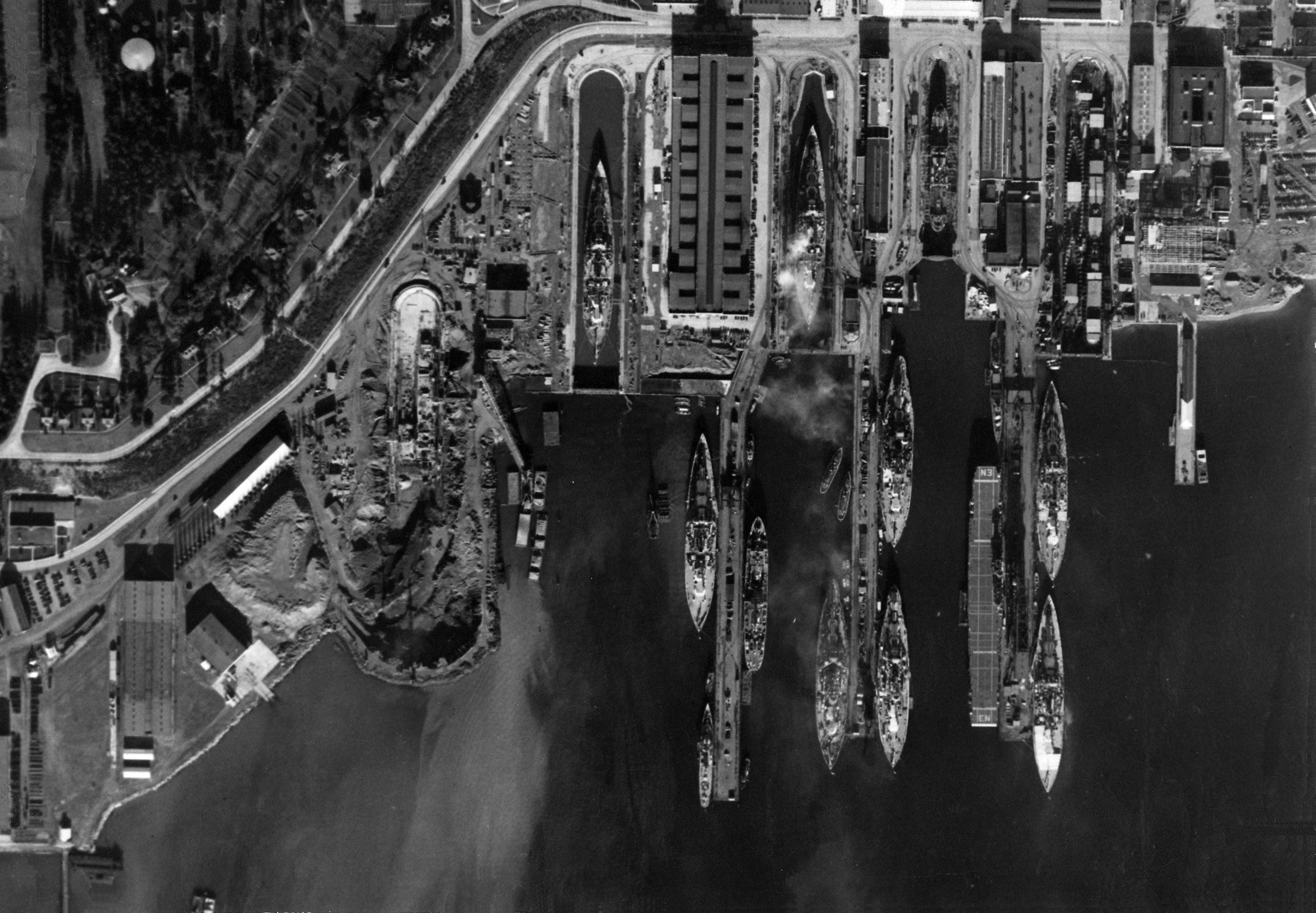
Puget Sound Navy Yard in 1940

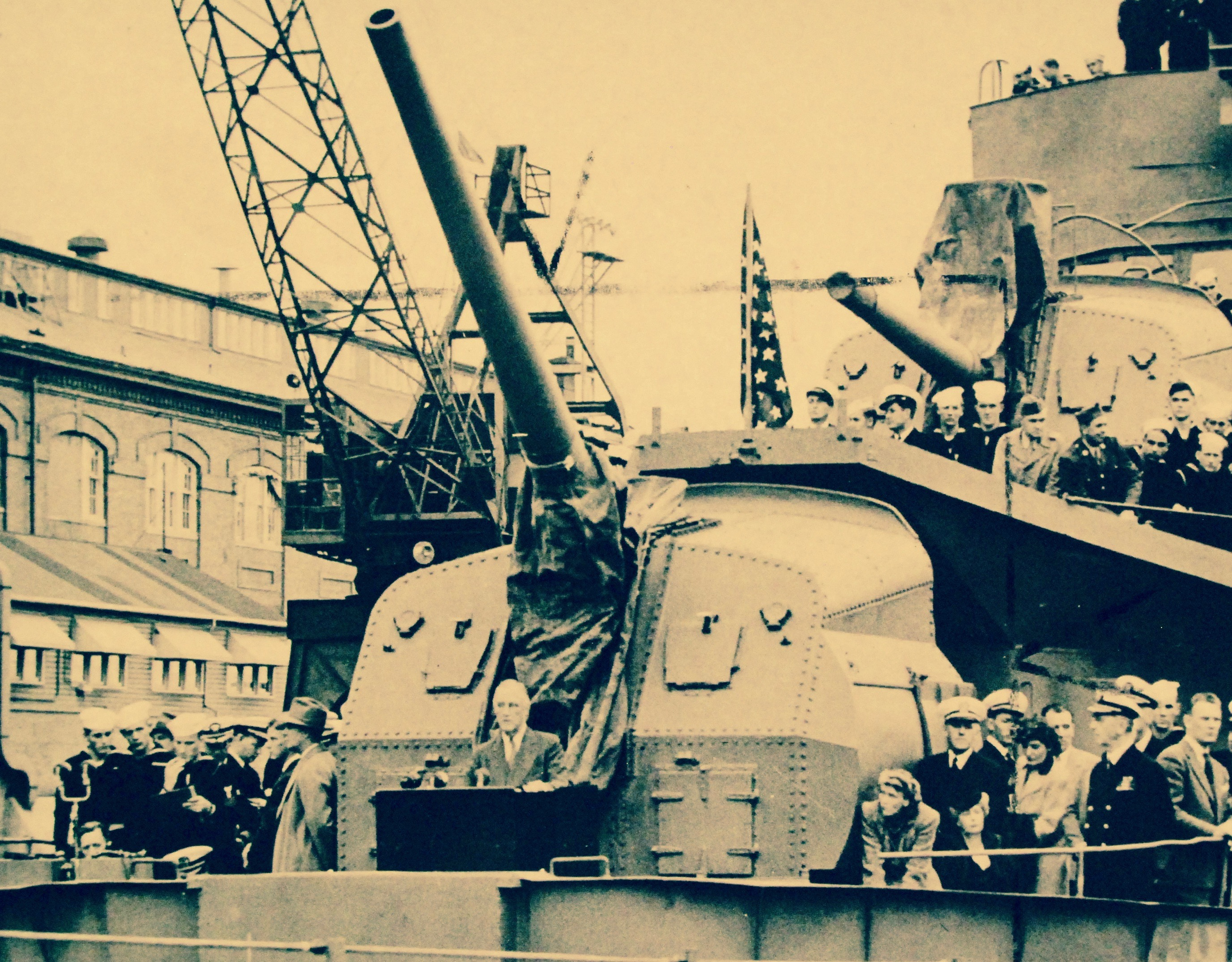
Franklin D. Roosevelt delivers a radio address (12 August 1944)

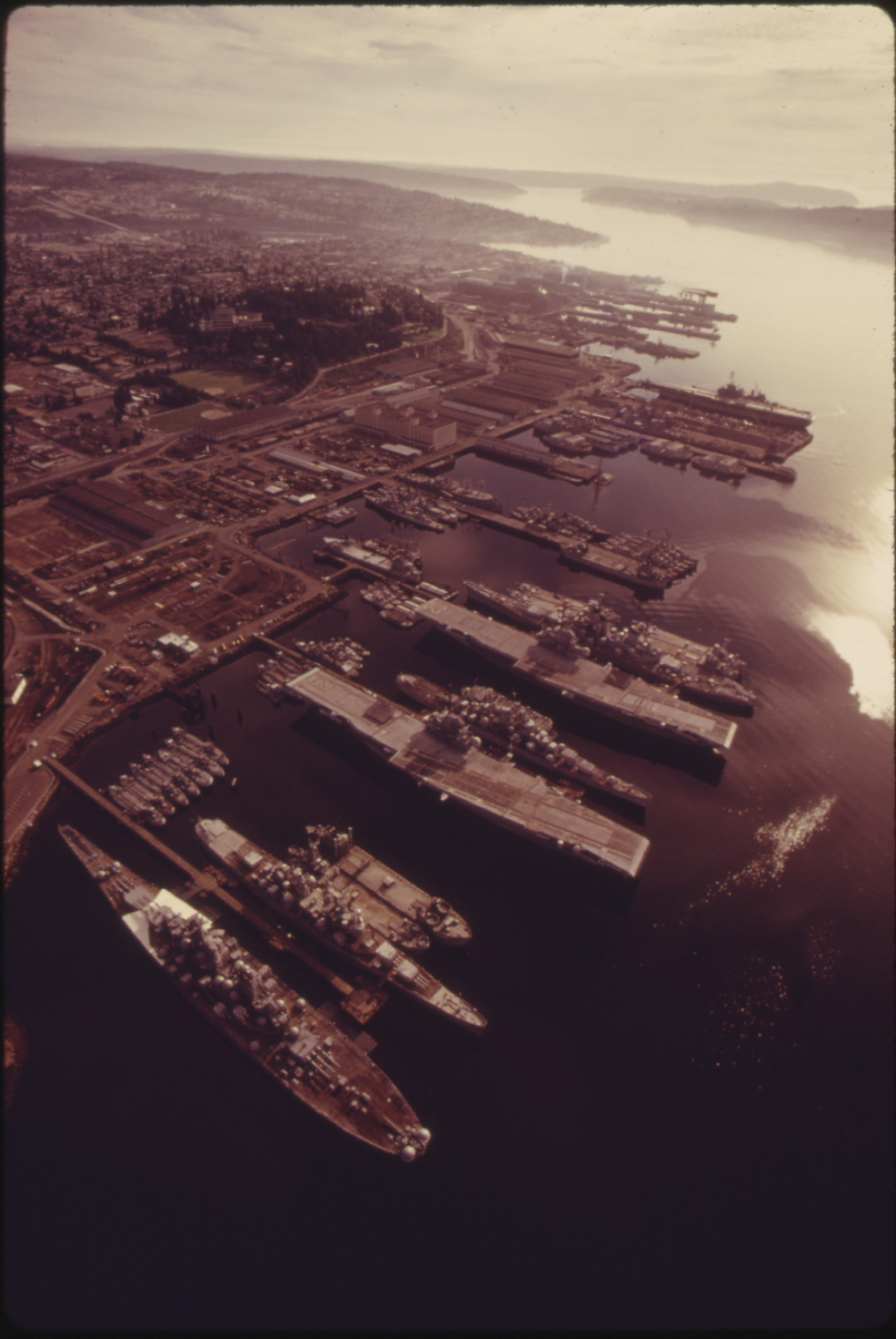
Mothballed ships in 1974

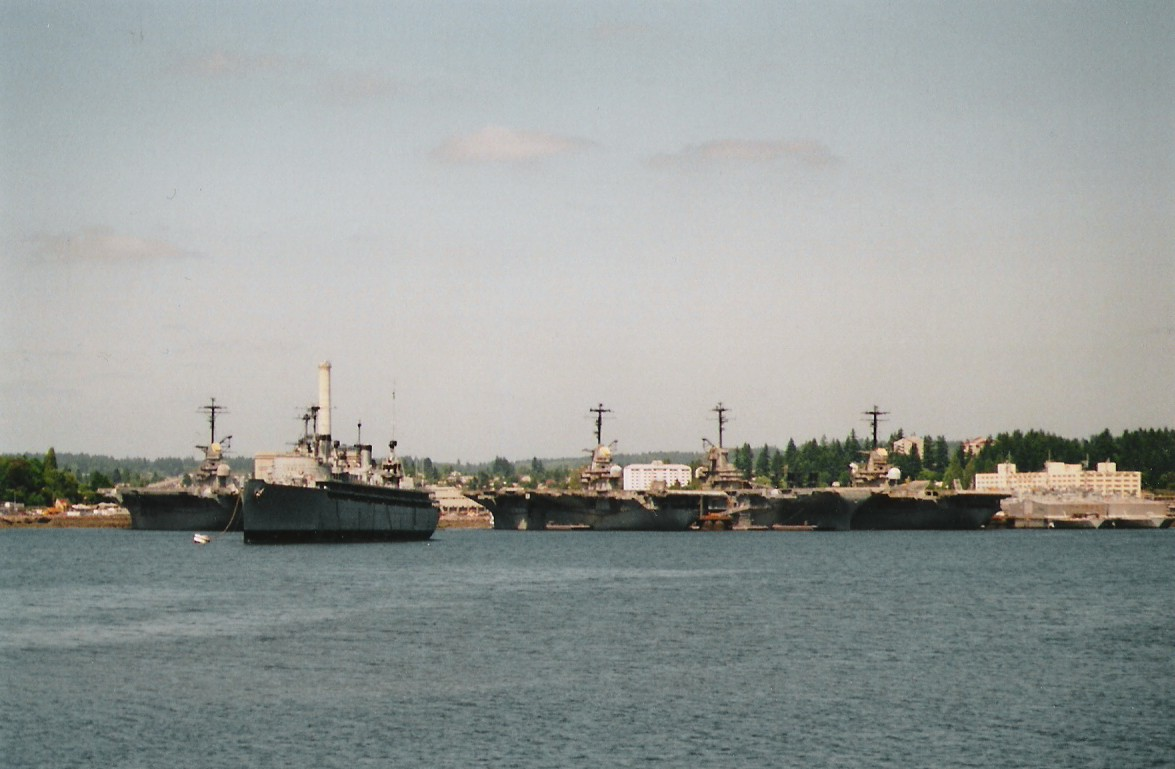
Retired Essex-class carriers in 1989

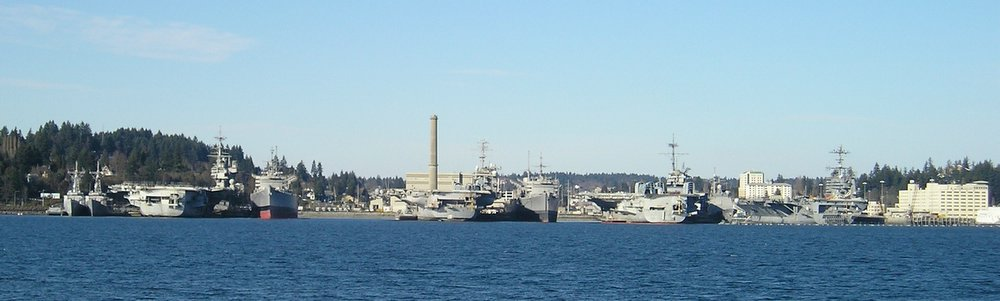
The mothball fleet in Puget Sound Naval Shipyard

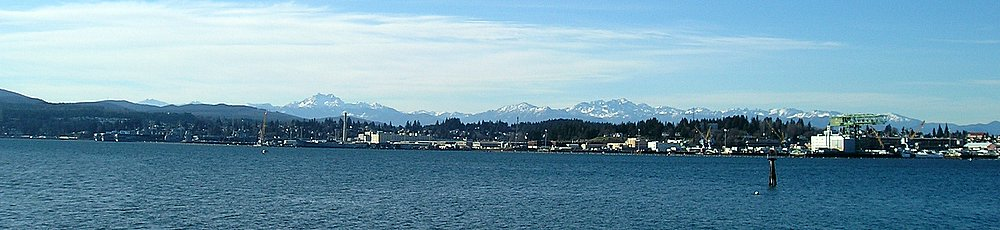
Puget Sound Naval Shipyard, as seen from across the water in Port Orchard. The mothballed ships are on the left, and the hammerhead crane is on the right.

== See also ==
- List of U.S. National Historic Landmark ships, shipwrecks, and shipyards
