= Hamma Hamma Balds Natural Area Preserve =

Protected area in Washington state, US

Hamma Hamma Balds
- Location within Washington (state)
- Location: Southwest Washington, Washington, United States
- Coordinates: 47.585°N 123.075°W
- Area: 957 acres (387 ha)
- Established: 2008 fiscal year
- Governing body: Washington Department of Natural Resources
- Website: dnr.wa.gov

Hamma Hamma Balds is a Washington state Natural Area Preserve. It is located in the eastern foothills of the Olympic Mountains in Mason County, above the Hamma Hamma River and adjacent to Olympic National Forest. The term "balds" refers to rocky outcroppings in the heavy forest. The preserve totals 957 acres (387 ha).

The preserve was created in the 2008 fiscal year through intra-agency land exchanges between various trusts.

== See also ==
- Appalachian balds
