= Hamma Hamma River bridges =

Historic bridges over the Hamma Hamma River

North and South Hamma Hamma Bridges
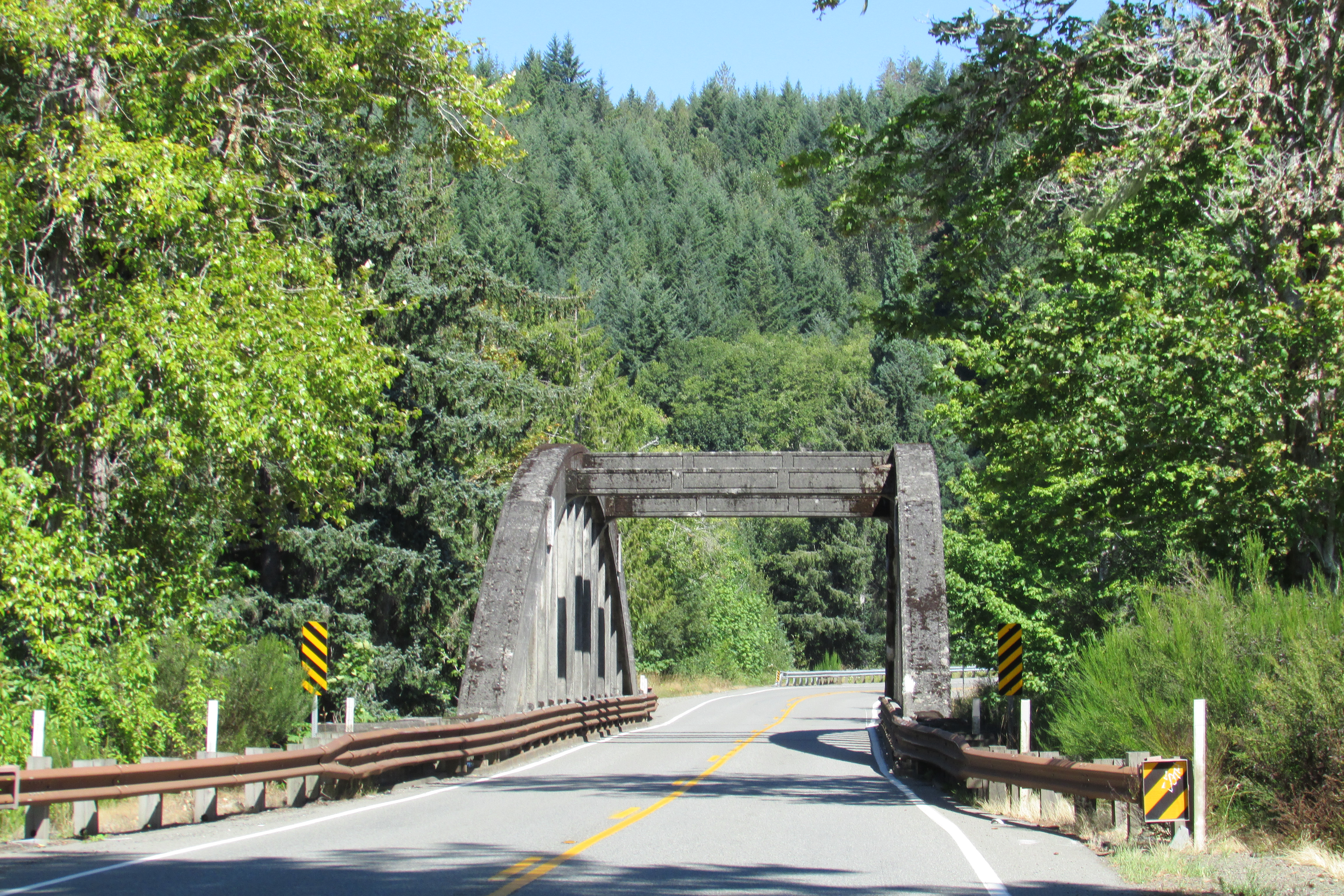
- North Bridge
- Carries: Vehicular traffic
- Crosses: North and South Fork, Hamma Hamma River
- Locale: Eldon, Washington, U.S.
- Owner: The Washington State Department of Transportation

History
- Engineering design by: The Washington State Department of Transportation
- Fabrication by: Colonial Building Company of Spokane
- Built: North - 1923 South - 1924

The Hamma Hamma River Bridges are two bridges that span the north and south forks of the Hamma Hamma River respectively. They were built as part of the Olympic Loop Highway, which is now U.S. Highway 101. Both bridges can be found on the National Register of Historic Places or National Register of Historic Places listings in Mason County, Washington.

== History ==
Both bridges cross a marsh created by the Hamma Hamma River. Originally, U.S Highway 101 went around this marsh and crossed the river before it split off into two parts.

In the early 1920s the Washington State Department of Transportation chose to cross the marsh, which shortened the alignment.

By spring of 1923, the engineers of these bridges finished designing it. In March of that year, State Highway Engineer, James Allen, signed off on the bridges. The State of Washington then applied for federal funding on March 24, which was provided by the Federal Aid Road Act of 1916. On the 8th of May, the project received formal United States Bureau of Public Roads approval.

The North Bridge finished being built in 1923 and the South in 1924. Since then, they've been modified twice. In 1977, the lowest overhead brace was removed to allow for more vehicle clearance and in the late 2000s, steel guard rails were added.

Both bridges have some hints of deterioration such as leaching, spalls, nicks from vehicles, and an occasional exposed reinforcement bar.

== Specifications ==
Each bridge is 154 feet long, and they both have a 150 foot three hinged arch with a rise of 30 feet. They are both three inch reinforced concrete through ribbed arch bridges. The bridges were built in 1923, northern bridge, and 1924, southern bridge, respectively. The bridges were engineered by the Washington State Department of Transportation and fabricated by the Colonial Building Company of Spokane.

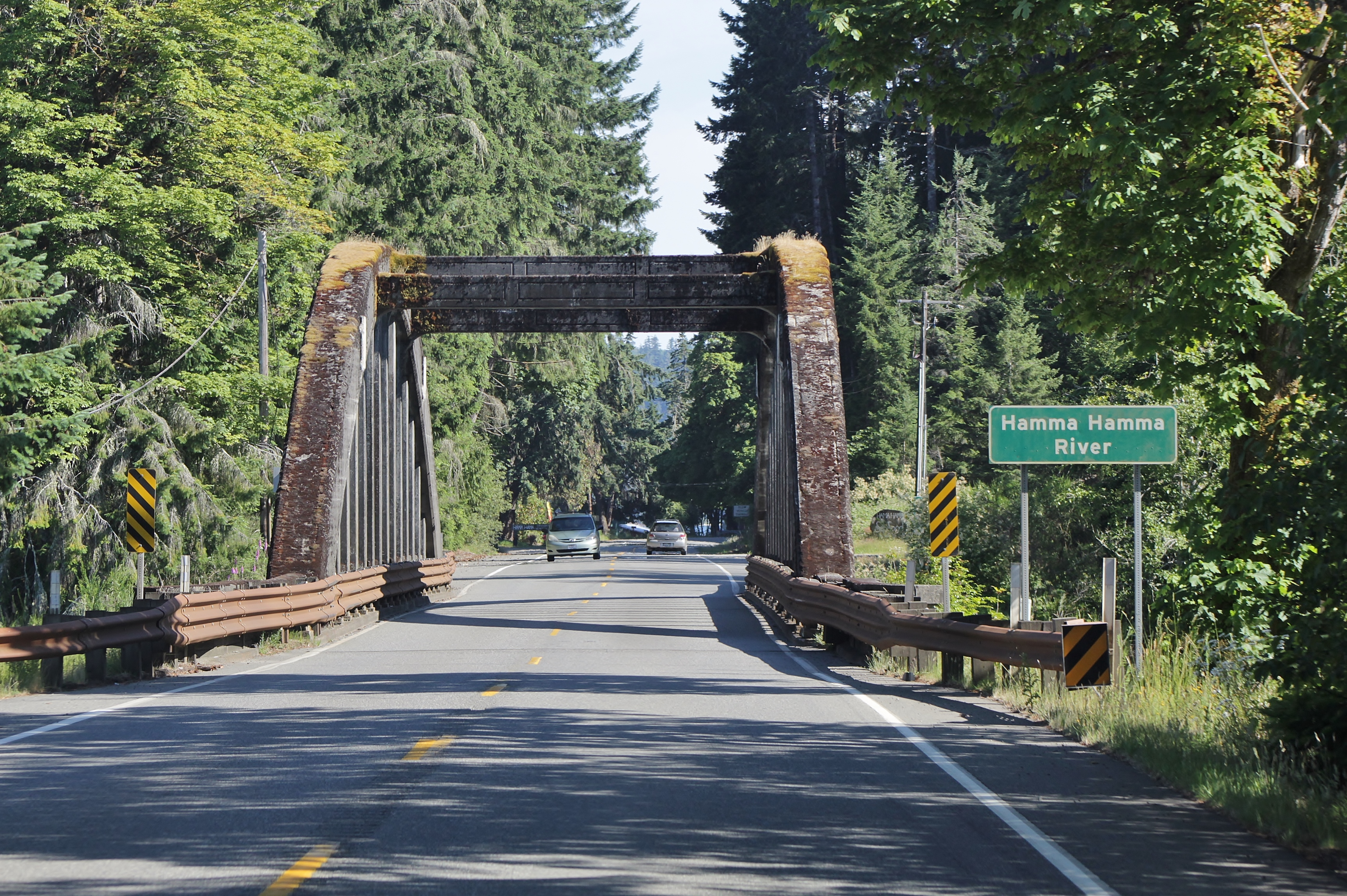
South Bridge

== See also ==
- Eldon, Washington
- National Register of Historic Places listings in Mason County, Washington
- List of bridges documented by the Historic American Engineering Record in Washington (state)
