= Hamma Hamma River =

- Location of the mouth of the Hamma Hamma River in Washington

Location
- Country: United States
- State: Washington
- County: Mason

Physical characteristics
- Source: Olympic Mountains
  - coordinates: 47°34′1″N 123°19′5″W
- Mouth: Hood Canal
  - coordinates: 47°32′44″N 123°2′30″W
- Discharge
  - location: near Eldon
  - average: 364.4 cu ft/s (10.32 m^{3}/s)
  - minimum: 39 cu ft/s (1.1 m^{3}/s)
  - maximum: 6,010 cu ft/s (170 m^{3}/s)

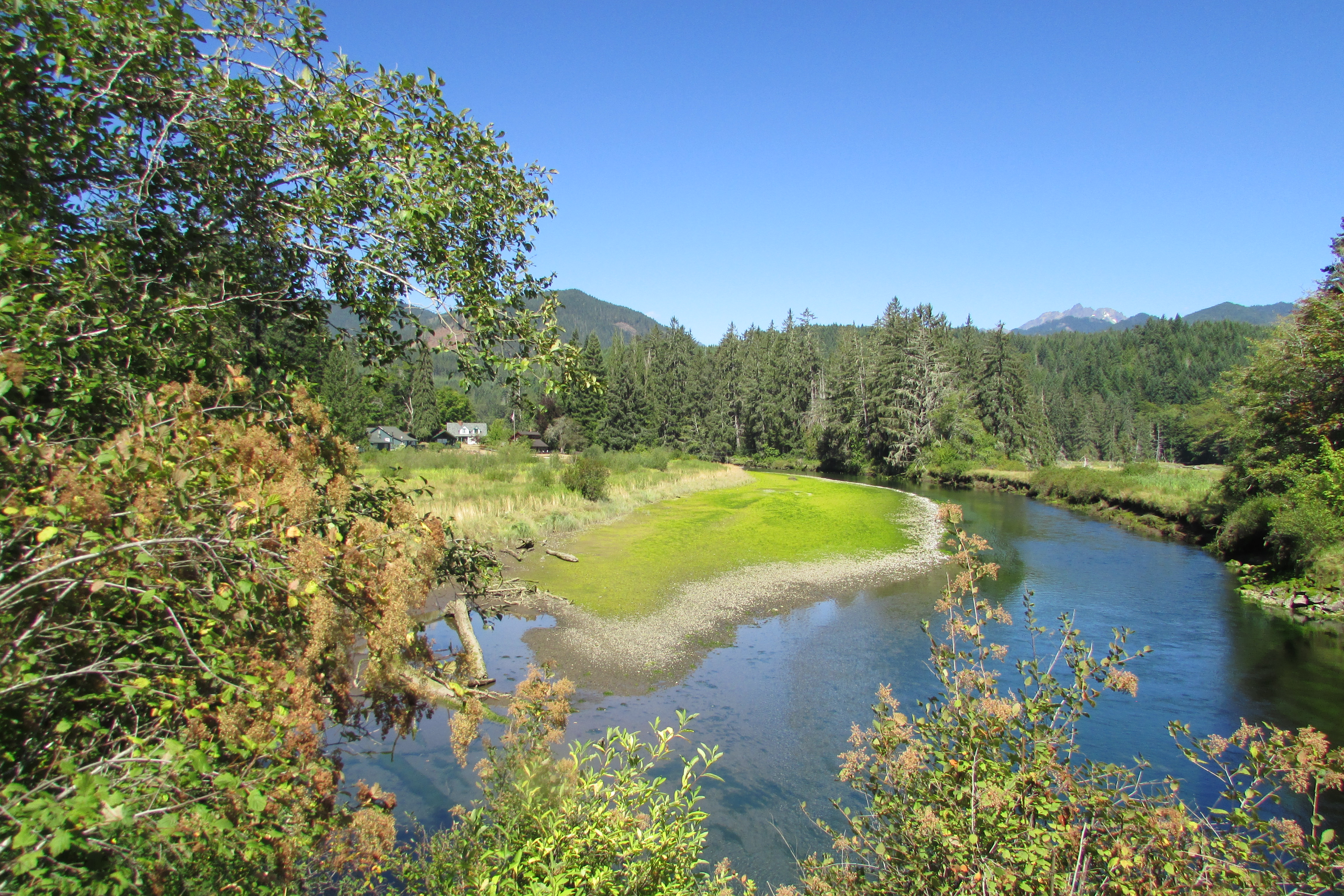
The Hamma Hamma River

The Hamma Hamma River is a river on the Olympic Peninsula in the U.S. state of Washington. It rises near Mount Washington in the Olympic Mountains within the Olympic National Park and drains to Hood Canal and thence to the Pacific Ocean.

The name Hamma Hamma comes from a Twana village once located at the river's mouth and called Hab'hab, referring to a reed that grows along the river's banks.

At its mouth, the river splits off into two channels which feed into the Hood Canal and create a marsh. There are two bridges that cross these parts and marsh called the North and South Hamma Hamma Bridges respectively.

Near the river, you can find the Hamma Hamma Balds Natural Area Preserve.

== Geology ==
The Hamma Hamma River begins deep within the Olympic Mountains, cutting through steep ridges that rise dramatically from sea level to over 6,000 feet. Flowing northeast between Mt. Ellinor and Mt. Washington, it carves one of the few major valleys that breach the mountain front before descending toward Hood Canal.

The river’s course is shaped by parallel ridges that direct its drainage and that of nearby streams like the North Fork Skokomish. Glacial activity during the Pleistocene greatly altered its path, leaving behind gravel plains, marshes, and smaller creeks that now feed into it as it winds toward the sea.

== Proposed Projects ==
=== Hamma Hamma Hydroelectric Project ===
The Draft Environmental Impact Statement for the Hamma Hamma Hydroelectric Project, prepared in 1985 by the U.S. Federal Energy Regulatory Commission, evaluated a proposed hydroelectric development on the Hamma Hamma River in Mason County, Washington. The report analyzed potential impacts on fish, wildlife, water quality, sediment transport, and other environmental factors, along with possible environment protection measures and project alternatives.

The document was part of the federal licensing process under the Federal Power Act and was intended to inform agencies, stakeholders, and the public about the environmental consequences of the proposal. As a draft, it did not represent final approval or guarantee that the project would be constructed.

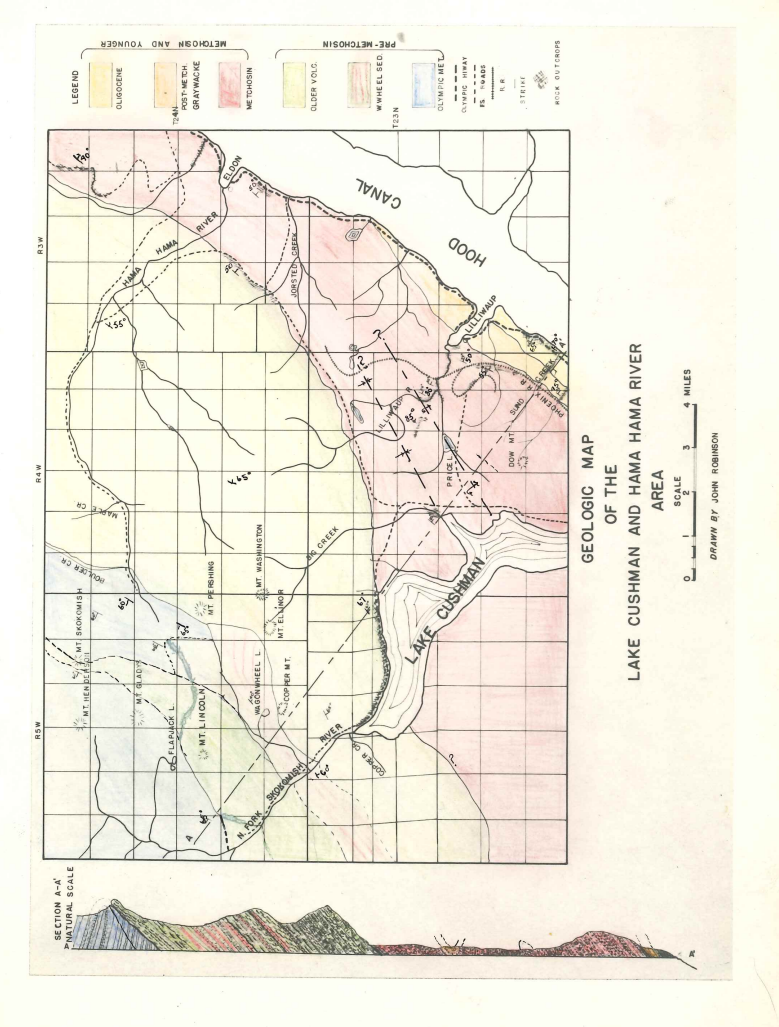
Geologic Map of the area

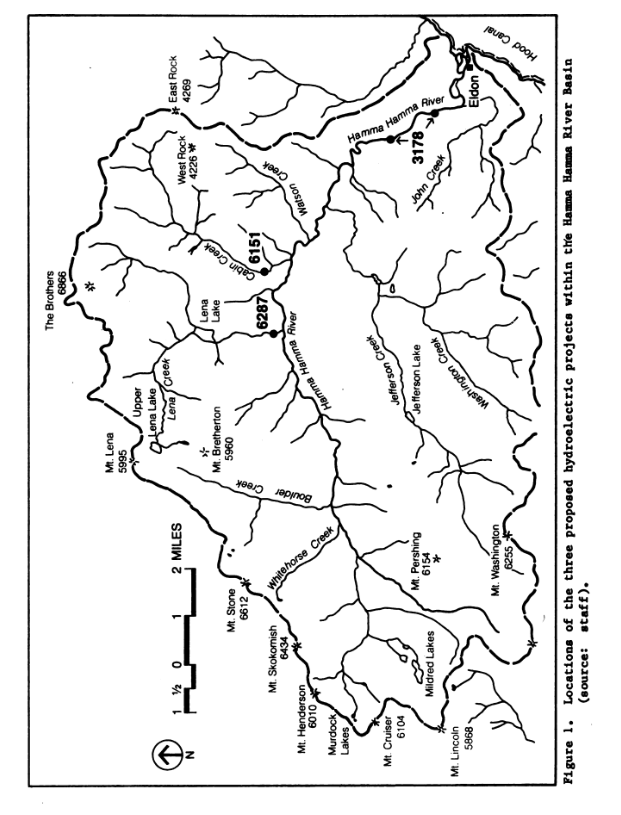
Locations of the proposed hydroelectric projects within the Hamma Hamma River Basin

== See also ==
- List of Washington rivers
- Eldon, Washington
- Hamma Hamma River Bridges
- Hamma Hamma Balds Natural Area Preserve
