= Hospital Reservation Historic District =

Historic district in Washington, United States

- U.S. National Register of Historic Places
- U.S. Historic district
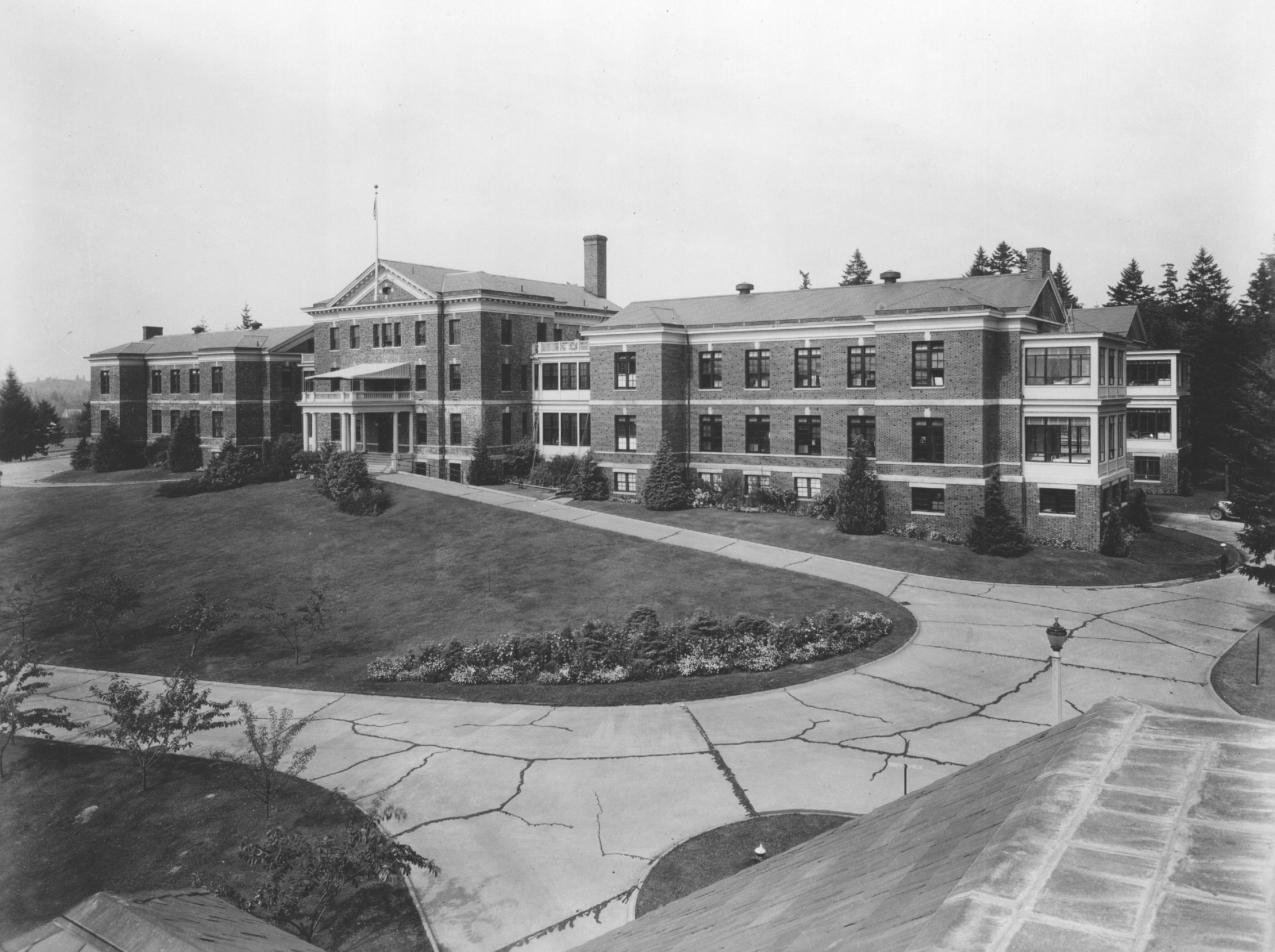
- Naval Hospital at Puget Sound Navy Yard in 1938

- Location within Washington (state) Location within the United States
- Location: Roughly bounded by Mahan Ave., Hoogewerf Rd., Decatur Ave., and Dewey St., Bremerton, Washington
- Area: 12 acres (4.9 ha)
- Built: 1923
- Architects: Gayler, E.R.; Et al.
- Architectural style: Colonial Revival, Classical Revival, Georgian Revival
- MPS: Puget Sound Naval Shipyard Shore Facilities TR
- NRHP reference No.: 88003052
- Added to NRHP: July 16, 1990

The Hospital Reservation Historic District is located between Radio Station and Officers Row Historic Districts and east of the Marine Reservation Historic District of the Puget Sound Naval Shipyard in Washington, United States. Established in 1909, it reached its maximum development in 1942. The following structures no longer remain:

1. "Main Hospital Building" (1911,1924): a Neo-Classical, two-story with basement brick complex.
2. "Recreation building" (1920): two-story vernacular wood frame structure with basement; to the west was a yard cemetery, which was relocated to the Presidio in San Francisco, California.
3. "Navy Female Nurse Corps Quarters" (1921) was a two-story wood frame structure.
4. "Three Isolation Buildings" (1915) were located of the main hospital. Along with other buildings constructed here, all but one isolation building were eventually connected to the main hospital building.

The existing six buildings in the district were the quarters for the Commanding Officer of the Naval Hospital Reservation, the dormitory for the hospital corpsmen, the sick officers quarters, quarters for the medical corps and two separate quarters for pharmacists. These set in a suburban setting of lawn and shrubs with adjacent parking lots. Five of the six buildings are brick construction in a Georgian Revival style. Quarters W (Facility #646) is a wood frame with Neo-Classical influences. The Hospital Reservation Historic District has three non-contributing structures, the utility building for the hospital (Facility #437, 1936), has been significantly altered and the two quarters buildings (#885 and #942) are post World War II.

== History ==
=== Establishment ===
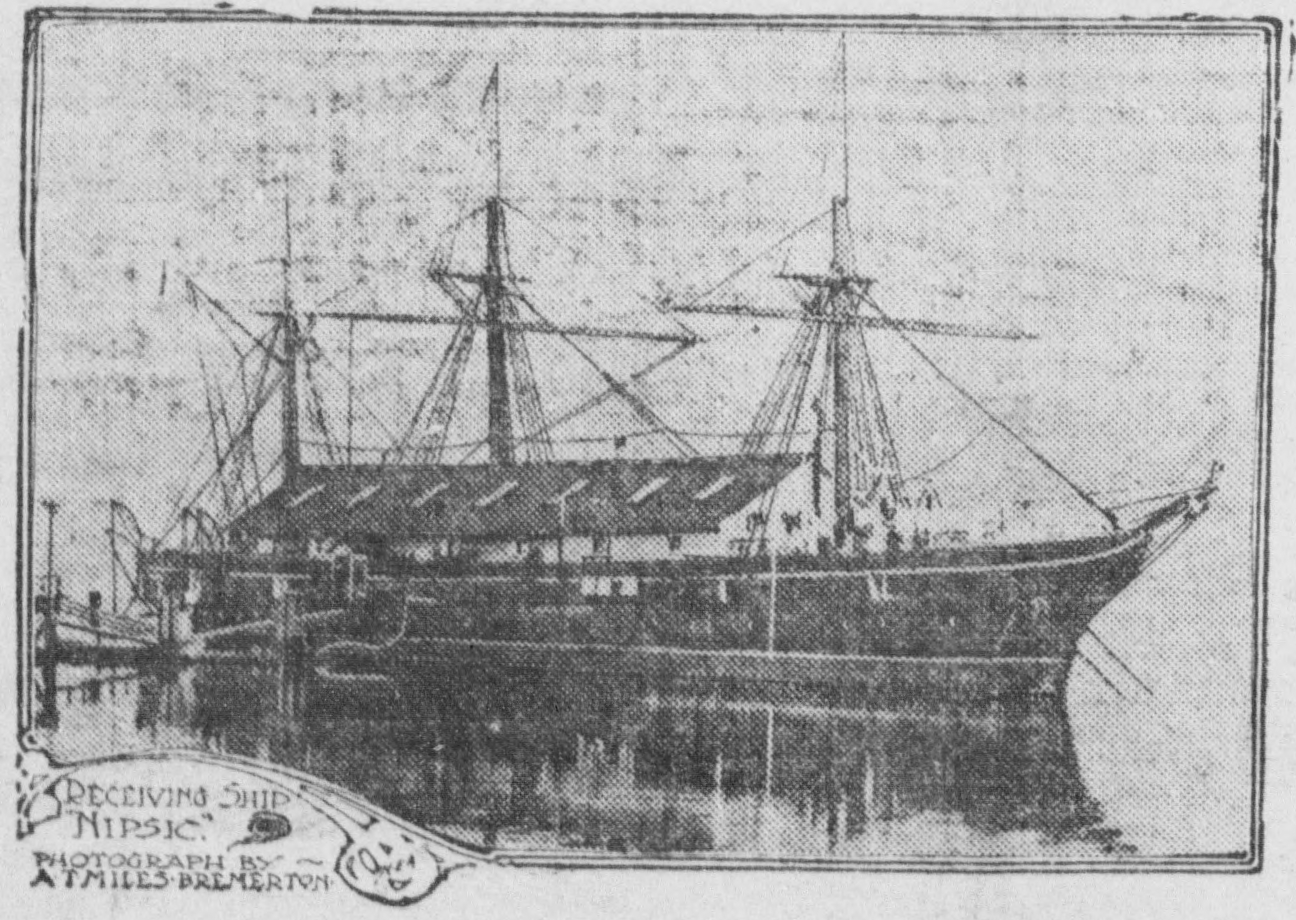
USS Nipsic docked at the Puget Sound Navy Shipyard in 1904.

The hospital complex was constructed between 1923 and 1942. The buildings were necessary to provide adequate medical care for employees of the navy yard. The first medical service at the Puget Sound Naval Shipyard began aboard USS Nipsic in 1895. Assistant Surgeon General James Stoughton set up Sick Quarters. Until permanent land side structures were available, the ship provided offices and quarters.

In 1901 a building above Dry Dock No. 1 was started, and it opened in 1903 as "Sick Quarters". The two-story frame building had four tents for 16 patients. In March 1903, it was designated a Naval Hospital. The staff was one surgeon and two stewards. During 1907 there were 225 patients. When contagious disease broke out among the industrial workers, the Surgeon General in 1907 sought to move the building away from the work areas. A site atop the western ridge was selected and construction began in 1909. In January 1911, the two-story brick administration building with two wings and housing 200 beds was finished. It took another year before it opened to properly furnish the building. The old hospital building was moved into Bremerton.

=== World War I era ===
In 1915, an isolation building was built. During the 1918 flu pandemic it was unable to handle the volume of patients. The staff included one medical officer, one nurse, two stewards and 12 American Red Cross nurse volunteers. During the peak of the epidemic, there were four to five deaths a day. During 1918, 89 patients died, 77 of those from the flu.

=== Inter-war years ===
By the 1920, the patient load had increased to 1515. Additional buildings were needed to meet the needs. On Nov. 8, 1920, an American Red Cross Hostess House opened that offered a relaxing home-like setting for patient recreation. A frame nurses quarters was added in June 1921. Over the next three years medical officer housing and a commanders quarters were built Commanding Officer of the Hospital Reservation (1923), and quarters for the medical officers (1923), pharmacists (1926), hospital corpsmen (1936) and sick officers (1942). The Quarters were built to insure that the hospital would have the available staff to provide adequate care. Previously, the nurses lived a mile outside the yard in a building shared with a motion picture theater and billiard hall. Medical officers would not be commissioned as housing was not available, so they were civilians. They had to use the basement rooms in Bremerton or commuted from Seattle.

Additions were also made to the main hospital. Masonry brick wings, connected by an enclosed corridor, were added to the hospital in 1924 and 1925. The hospital reached a capacity of 400 beds Worked stopped during the 1930s due to the Great Depression. Public Works Administration (PWA) projects began on base in 1936. They built the corpsmen barracks and another hospital wing. The hospital now consisted of the administration building and eight wings.

=== World War II era ===
Medical services expanded before the war to include navy personnel and their dependents throughout Puget Sound. To meet the war needs, temporary wood frame structures were established. An H-type temporary wards and temporary barracks for Women Accepted for Voluntary Emergency Service (WAVES) was added in 1943. The WAVES performed clerical and support services in the hospital. The patient count for all of World War II was more than 29,000.

=== Post-war ===
During the Korean War (1950s) the hospital had 17,000 admissions. During the Vietnam War the hospital served as a receiving facility for casualties from Vietnam. An estimated 70 war casualties were at the hospital during that time.

By 1968 and the Vietnam War the Naval was a 295-bed complex, able to expand to 509 beds in an emergency. It included 31 buildings. Of these, 22 were permanent masonry and 12 housed patients. Most were connected by enclosed walkways. Patient census averaged about 220 at any one time with peak period of occupancy of nearly 260." There was 375 staff with 240 Navy personnel. The medical staff included 37 doctors, two dentists, 12 medical service corps officers, 24 nurses, and one chaplain. In addition to navy personnel there were 19 civilian nurses, 14 nursing assistants, and other civilians in a variety of duties.

=== Closures ===
The Hospital Reservation continued as a part of the naval shore facility until 1980. In 1974, a new facility was recommended, land in Jackson Park was set aside and efforts began for Congressional approval. In 1980, medical services were moved to the former Naval Ammunition Depot Site on Ostrich Bay in Jackson Park. Naval Hopital Bremerton is the parent command for three branch clinics; Puget Sound Naval Shipyard, Naval Station Everett, and Naval Base Kitsap Bangor.

== Contributing Structures ==
=== Dormitory for Hospital Corpsmen ===
Building	Built	Current Function	Historic Function	Designed by
#443	1936	Security Office & Training Facility	Dormitory for Hospital Corpsmen	Puget Sound Navy Yard, Bremerton

The Dormitory for Hospital Corpsmen, Building 443 is a two-story brick veneer building with basement. The building measures 115 to 56 feet (35 to 17 m) in a rectangular shape with two projecting bays on either side of the central entry. The building is clad in a reddish-brown brick with a running bond pattern. Between the upper and lower windows, a decorative brick pattern in the form of a square surrounds a small cast stone inset. Above the entry is a wood double "French door" with semi-circular fanlight and with a wrought iron balcony railing. The gable walls meet the roof in a classical form of broken pediment.

=== Sick Officers Quarters ===
Building	Built	Current Function	Historic Function	Designed by
#491	1942	Safety & Environment Health Offices	Sick Officers Quarters	Puget Sound Navy Yard, Bremerton

Building 491 is one of two surviving buildings of the Naval Hospital Reservation at the Shipyard. Building 491 was built as Sick Officers Quarters. It was next to the hospital and connected via a tunnel. Building 491 reflects the "Federal" style.

=== Sick Officers Quarters ===
Building	Built	Current Function	Historic Function	Designed by
#644 & #645	1923	Officer’s Quarters (v) & Garage	Sick Officers Quarters	Puget Sound Navy Yard, Bremerton

Officer's Quarters(V) is a two-story brick structure, measuring 89 to 56 feet (27 to 17 m) with an attic and basement. This is a multi-plex building with four residences. It has a jerkinhead style roof with hip roof dormers. The building shows "Georgian" with flat arches of brick with limestone keystones and sills. The main entry door is wood and glass set with a semi-circular arched opening. The doorway is a Palladian motif with a central door and side lights.

The residence are single floors spaces with two units upstairs and two down. The upstairs units are reached by a common stairway. Residential entries are marble with terrazzo insets, general flooring is fir; and walls are plaster on wood lath. Glass French doors separate a living room from the dining room. There are 9 feet (2.7 m) ceilings throughout and a fireplace of brick, quarry tile hearth and simple wood mantle.

=== Officer’s Quarters ===
Building	Built	Current Function	Historic Function	Designed by
#646 & #647	1923	Officer’s Quarters (v) & Garage	Quarters W for Com Off Naval Hosp	Puget Sound Navy Yard, Bremerton

The Commanding Officer of the Naval Hospital Reservation Quarters was built in 1923. In 1990, it remained the quarters for the Hospital Commander. The building has a formal "Federal" design. It was located within the Hospital Reservation, with a large grassy lawn, set away from other structures.

=== Navy Hospital Pharmacists Quarters ===
Building	Built	Current Function	Historic Function	Designed by
#648	1923	Officer's Quarters (x)	Naval Hospital Pharmacists Quarters	Puget Sound Navy Yard, Bremerton

Two Naval Hospital Pharmacists Quarters were built on base, Building 648 is one of two. These are assigned Warrant Officers housing. They were built in 1926 by the Navy Yard, Puget Sound, Captain W.H. Alien, U.S.N., and Public Works Officer. This is a small brick building, 35 by 25 feet (10.7 by 7.6 m) with "Georgian" details. Both quarters are on Gatewood Avenue. A two-story frame building, gable roof and a brick exterior. The "Georgian" motifs include the fanlight over the entry door, rectangular window openings and a round window within the gable. In 1946 it became the Corps Officer's Quarters for the Naval Hospital. In 1948, it became the Naval Hospital's Personnel Officer's quarters. When the hospital moved to it Oyster Bay location in 1980, it was assigned as Naval Base Officer's quarters. Building 648 is a rectangular brick two-story residence with a basement.

=== Navy Hospital Pharmacists Quarters ===
Building	Built	Current Function	Historic Function	Designed by
#649	1926	Officer's Quarters (y) & garage	Navy Hospital Pharmacists Quarters	Puget Sound Navy Yard, Bremerton

Navy Hospital Pharmacists Quarters, Building 649 is the second of the two Warrant Officers Quarters on the Hospital Reservation. It is the same as Building #648. When the Hospital was moved from the shipyard, it was converted to housing for Staff Officers of the Pacific Reserve Fleet.

== Puget Sound Naval Shipyard Historic Districts ==
The Puget Sound Naval Shipyard contains five historic districts:

1. Officers' Row Historic District;
2. Puget Sound Radio Station Historic District;
3. Hospital Reservation Historic District;
4. Puget Sound Naval Shipyard Historic District; and
5. Marine Reservation Historic District.

These five units are a comprehensive representation of the historic features of the naval shipyard.
