= Puget Sound Naval Shipyard Historic District =

Historic district in Washington, United States

- Navy Yard Puget Sound
- U.S. National Register of Historic Places
- U.S. National Historic Landmark District
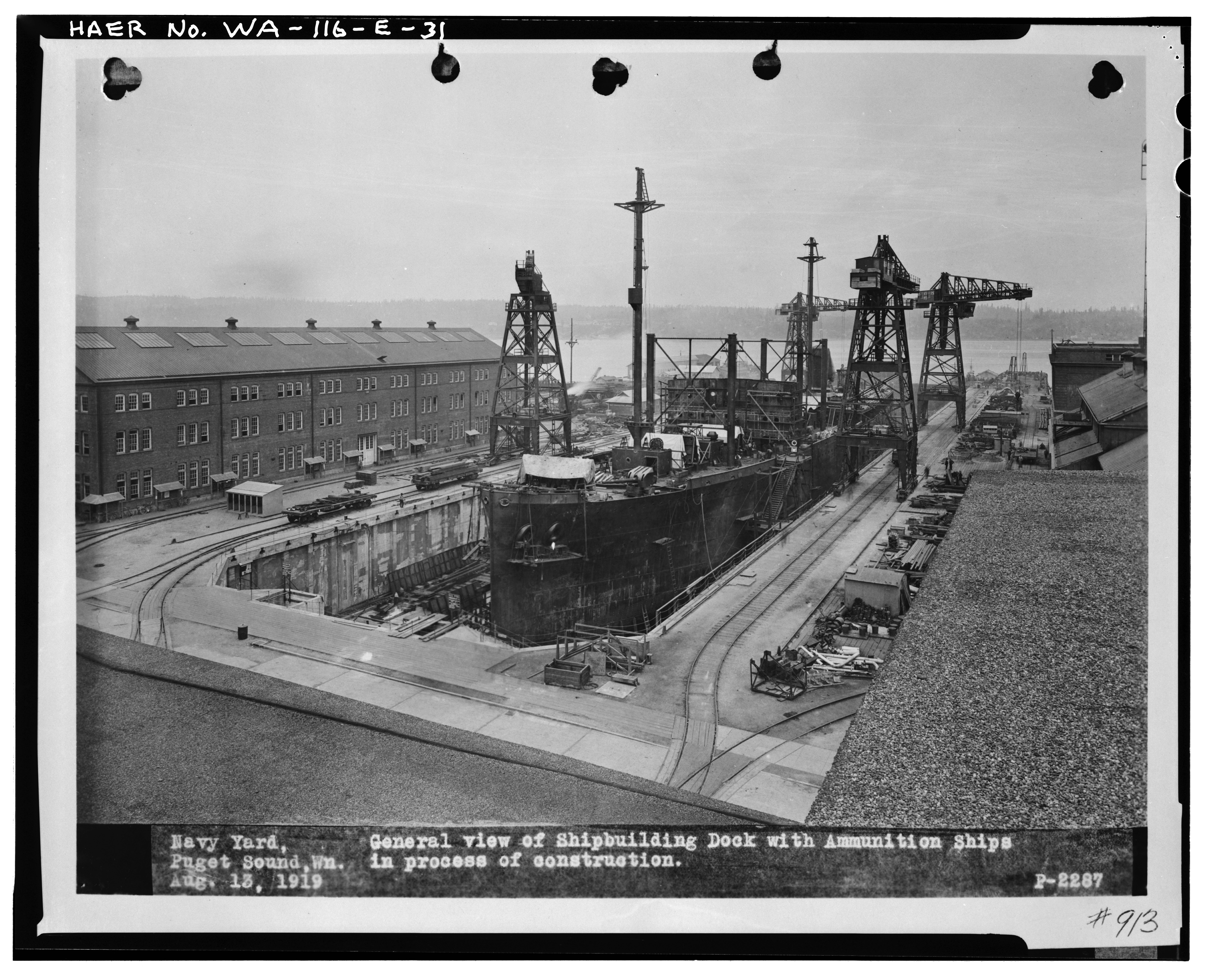
- General view of Shipbuilding Dock with Ammunition Ships in process of construction. August 13, 1919.

- Location within Washington (state) Location within the United States
- Location: N shore of Sinclair Inlet, Bremerton, Washington
- Area: 189 acres (76 ha)
- Architect: US Navy
- NRHP reference No.: 92001883
- Added to NRHP: August 27, 1992

Puget Sound Naval Shipyard is a large military-industrial complex located in Bremerton, Washington along the north shore of Sinclair Inlet, which opens to Puget Sound. This large shipyard is 1.5 miles (2.4 km) in length along the shore and over a half-mile in width at its greatest distance across. The shipyard has nearly 1,000 facilities such as shipfitters shops, repair shops, drydocks, piers, cranes, crane rails, railways, and tunnels. In addition to the industrial facilities, supporting structures include: residences for officers and enlisted personnel, recreation facilities, boiler, electrical substations, fuel tanks, medical facilities, and canteens. The historic district is just over a tenth of the entire shipyard, 189 acres (76 hectares) of the shipyard's 1,347 acres (545 hectares). Its greatest significance was during the Second World War when it repaired large warships damaged in the Pacific theater. It was designated a National Historic Landmark District in 1992.

== Origins ==
A board of army engineers recommended a west coast naval station and drydocks on Puget Sound as early as 1867. In 1889, under Capt. Alfred Thayer Mahan, USN, the navy began the search for a navy yard in the Pacific Northwest and Alaska. The commission recommended Point Turner in Puget Sound, where Bremerton is located. Political opposition from California and Oregon held up the approval and funding until 1891. The Navy purchased 190 acres (77 hectares), purchased for $9,513, from a Seattle land speculator, William Bremer. Construction began in 1892 with Drydock No. 1. It was completed in April 1896. On April 11, 1897, the USS Oregon became the first ship to dock at the station. In 1902, the station was changed from the Puget Sound Naval Station to the Navy Yard Puget Sound. The Great White Fleet having completed its world cruise in 1908 returned to the US at the Navy Yard Puget Sound to refuel.at the coaling station.

== World War I ==
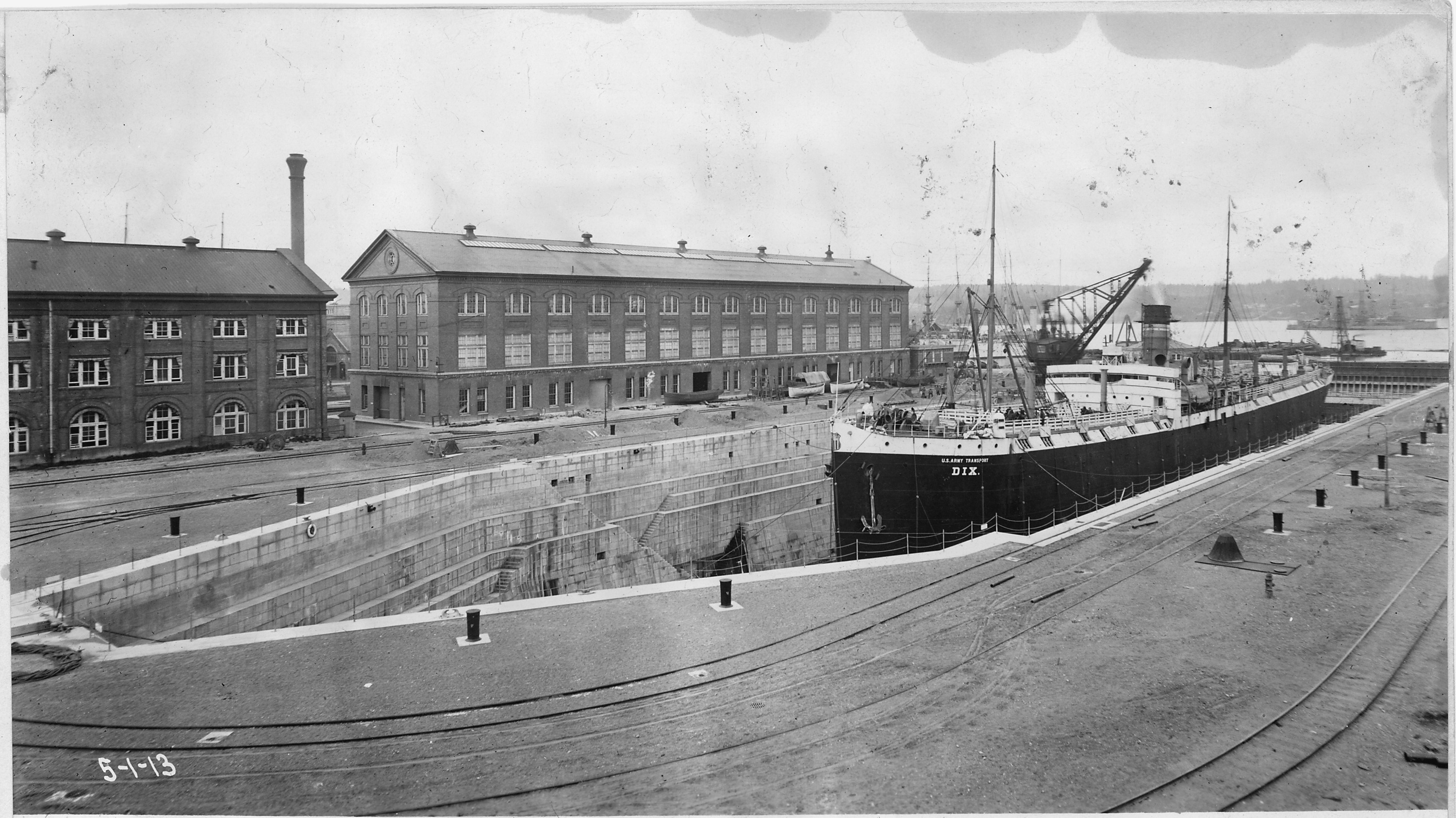
Dry Dock No. 2, USAT Dix in dock, looking SE

Drydock 2 was completed in 1913. Constructed with granite and concrete, the completed drydock was the largest in the US Navy at that time. In 1917, before the United States entered World War I, the Navy Department decided to build ships at the yard. Drydock 3 was constructed for this purpose, although it was not completed until 1919. By the end of the war, the 6,500 workers at Bremerton had undertaken the construction of 42 vessels, including subchasers, submarines, Minesweeper, ocean tugs, and ammunition ships, in addition to 1,700 small boats. Between the two wars, shipbuilding continued. Light cruiser USS Louisville was launched in 1930 and cruiser USS Astoria in 1933. In the 1930s, Drydock 2 was enlarged to accommodate two new aircraft carriers, USS Lexington and USS Saratoga.

== World War II ==
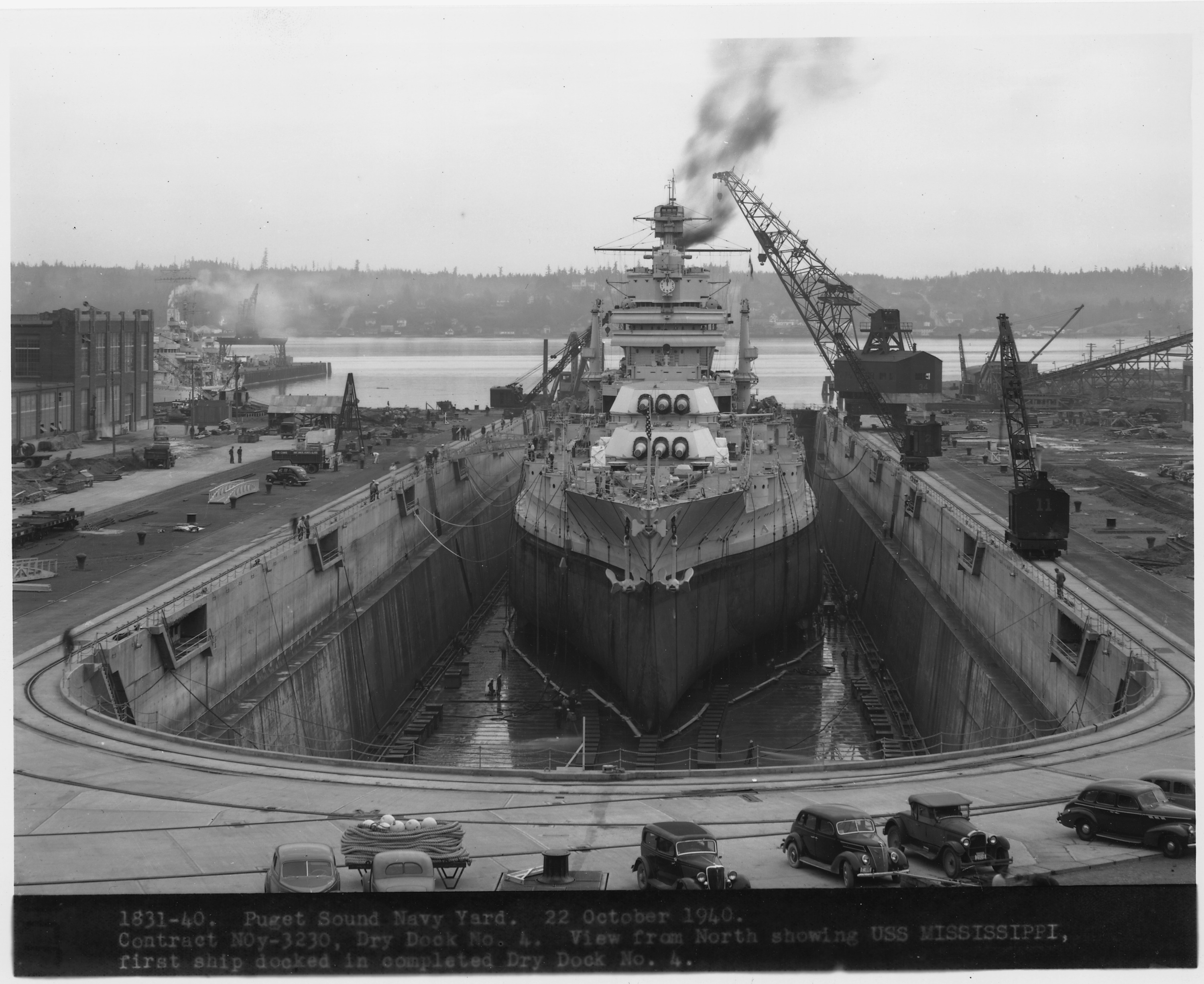
Dry Dock No. 4. View from North showing USS Mississippi, first ship docked in completed Dry Dock No. 4

Beginning in 1938 and extending into the early 1940s, Navy Yard Puget Sound underwent major improvements, including the construction of 1,000' long Drydocks 4 and 5, which were sufficiently large for the new fast battleships then under construction. New quays, piers, and shop buildings were installed. Two double shipbuilding ways, no longer extant, were constructed for building escort vessels. Five of the battleships damaged on December 7, 1941 at Pearl Harbor came to Bremerton for repairs: USS Tennessee, USS Maryland, USS Nevada, USS California, and USS West Virginia. The Tennessee received new 14-inch rifles for her main battery; the anti-aircraft guns were replaced with 20mm and 40mm batteries, and the ship was completely modernized. The Nevada was extensively rebuilt and sailed from Puget Sound in time for the Aleutian campaign of 1943. The California had been sunk at Pearl Harbor. She was raised, and towed to Bremerton for repairs. The California rejoined the battle in January 1944. The West Virginia was hit by six or seven torpedoes, taking a longer time to repair, rejoining the fleet in July 1944. In January 1944, Maryland and Colorado returned to Puget Sound for rebuilding. Both battleships were returned to the fleet in time for the assault on the Marianas. Other well-known battleships that arrived at the yard during the war included USS Pennsylvania, USS Washington, USS New Jersey, and USS South Dakota.

When the aircraft carrier Saratoga was torpedoed in January 1942 by a Japanese submarine, she was sent to Bremerton for repairs and modernization. The hope was to release the carrier for the June Battle of Midway, but that work was too extensive. Other carriers sent for repairs, included the USS Enterprise, USS Bunker Hill, USS Franklin, USS Ticonderoga, USS Wasp, and Lexington.

When the kamikaze entered the war, large numbers of ships were returned for repairs. The destroyer USS Lamson was hit by a kamikaze off Leyte on December 6, 1944; 25 men were killed and 54 men wounded, the superstructure from the forecastle deck up to the stacks was destroyed, and the forward fireroom flooded. The Bremerton yard replaced 90% of the superstructure, between the end of January and mid-April 1945. Kamikaze attacks increased fast turnarounds became a necessity. By the end of the war, the Navy Yard Puget Sound had repaired, overhauled, and modernized 344 fighting ships of all types. On August 12, 1944, President Franklin D. Roosevelt arrived onboard cruiser USS Indianapolis. From Drydock 2 the President thanked the workers for their contribution to the war.

== Post-war ==
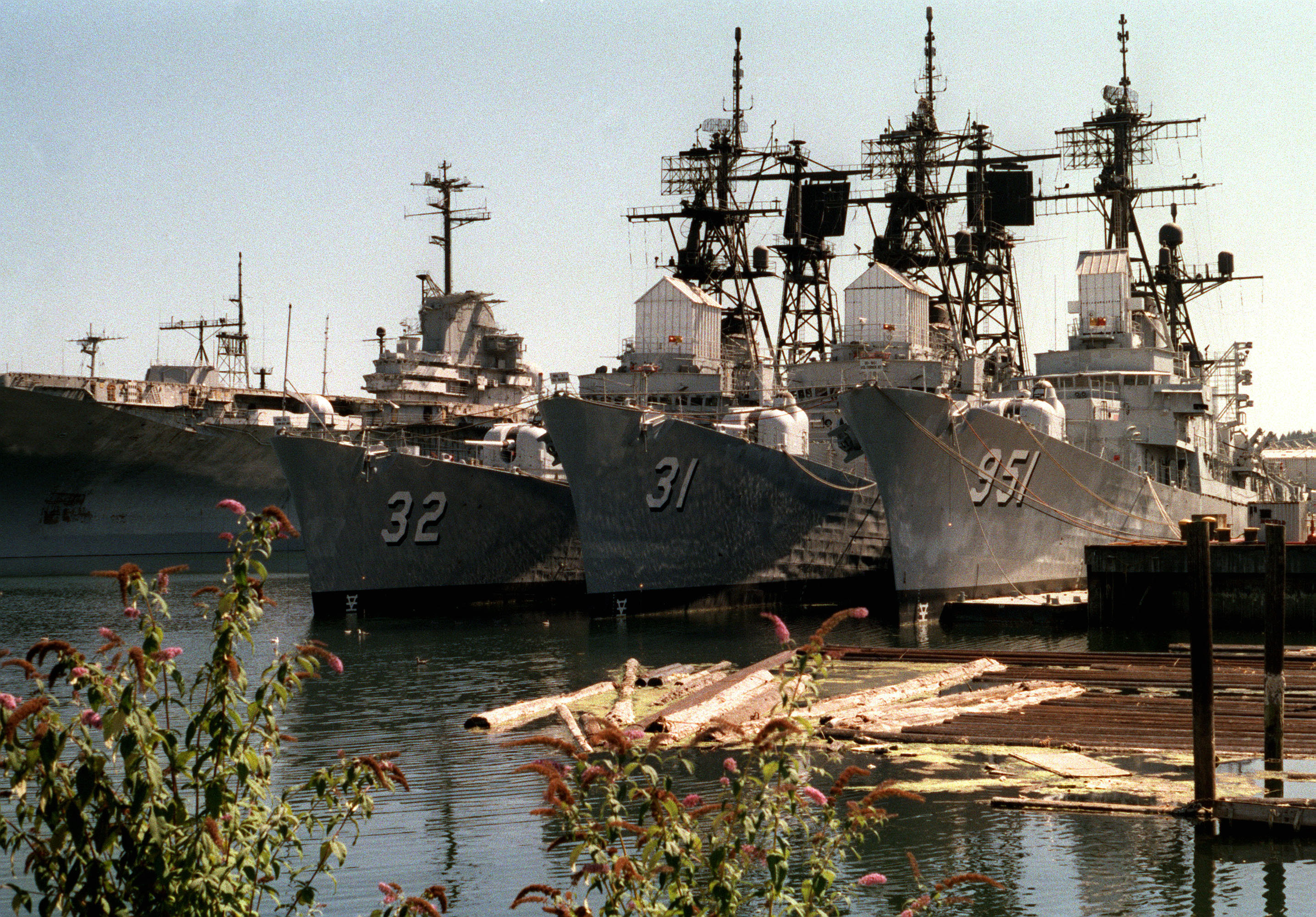
The U.S. Navy guided missile destroyer USS John Paul Jones, the guided missile destroyer USS Decatur and the destroyer USS Turner Joy laid up at the Naval Inactive Ship Maintenance Facility at the Puget Sound Naval Shipyard, Bemerton, Washington (USA), in 1990. In the background at left is the aircraft carrier USS Bon Homme Richard.

On December 1, 1945, the navy yard's name was changed to Puget Sound Naval Shipyard. After the war, the Naval Inactive Ship Maintenance Facility became a tenant at the shipyard. Until 1998, USS Missouri was moored here, and was for a time open to visitors. Inactive ships today include aircraft carriers, cruisers, destroyers, and submarines. Puget Sound Naval Shipyard has remained active since World War II. During the Korean War, it was engaged in a ship activation program. In 1957, construction of guided missile ships began. Since 1961, Puget Sound has been engaged in the repair of both conventional and nuclear-powered aircraft carriers, surface ships, and submarines.

== Puget Sound Naval Shipyard Historic Districts ==
The Puget Sound Naval Shipyard contains five historic districts:

1. Officers' Row Historic District;
2. Puget Sound Radio Station Historic District;
3. Hospital Reservation Historic District;
4. Puget Sound Naval Shipyard Historic District; and
5. Marine Reservation Historic District.

These five units are a comprehensive representation of the historic features of the naval shipyard.

== Bibliography ==
- Grulich Architectural and Planning Services. Historic Survey of Puget Sound Naval Shipyard. Bremerton. Washington. Tacoma, Washington: 1985.
- Kitsap County Historical Society. Kitsap County History, A Story of Kitsap County and Its Pioneer. Seattle: Dinner and Klein, 1977.
- Morison, Samuel Eliot. The Rising Sun in the Pacific. 1931 – April 1942. History of the United States Naval Operations in World War II, vol. 3. Boston: Little, Brown, 1982 reprint. Preston, Antony. Aircraft Carriers. New York: Galahad Books, 1979.
- Puget Sound Naval Shipyard. The First 75 Years. n.p., 1966.
- Reh, Louise M. Fifty Dollars an Acre, A History of the Puget Sound Naval Shipyard. 1891 to 1916. Bremerton: Red Deer Press, 1983.
- U.S. Navy. Bureau of Yards and Docks. Building the Navy's Bases in World War II, 2 vols. Washington: U.S. Government Printing Office, 1947.
- U.S. Navy. Bureau of Yards and Docks 13th Naval District. "General Correspondence of 13th Naval District and Components," and Puget Sound Naval Shipyard, "Correspondence Files, 1941–1946," both in Federal Archives and Records Center, Seattle, Washington.
