= Officers' Row Historic District =

Historic district in Washington, United States

- U.S. National Register of Historic Places
- U.S. Historic district
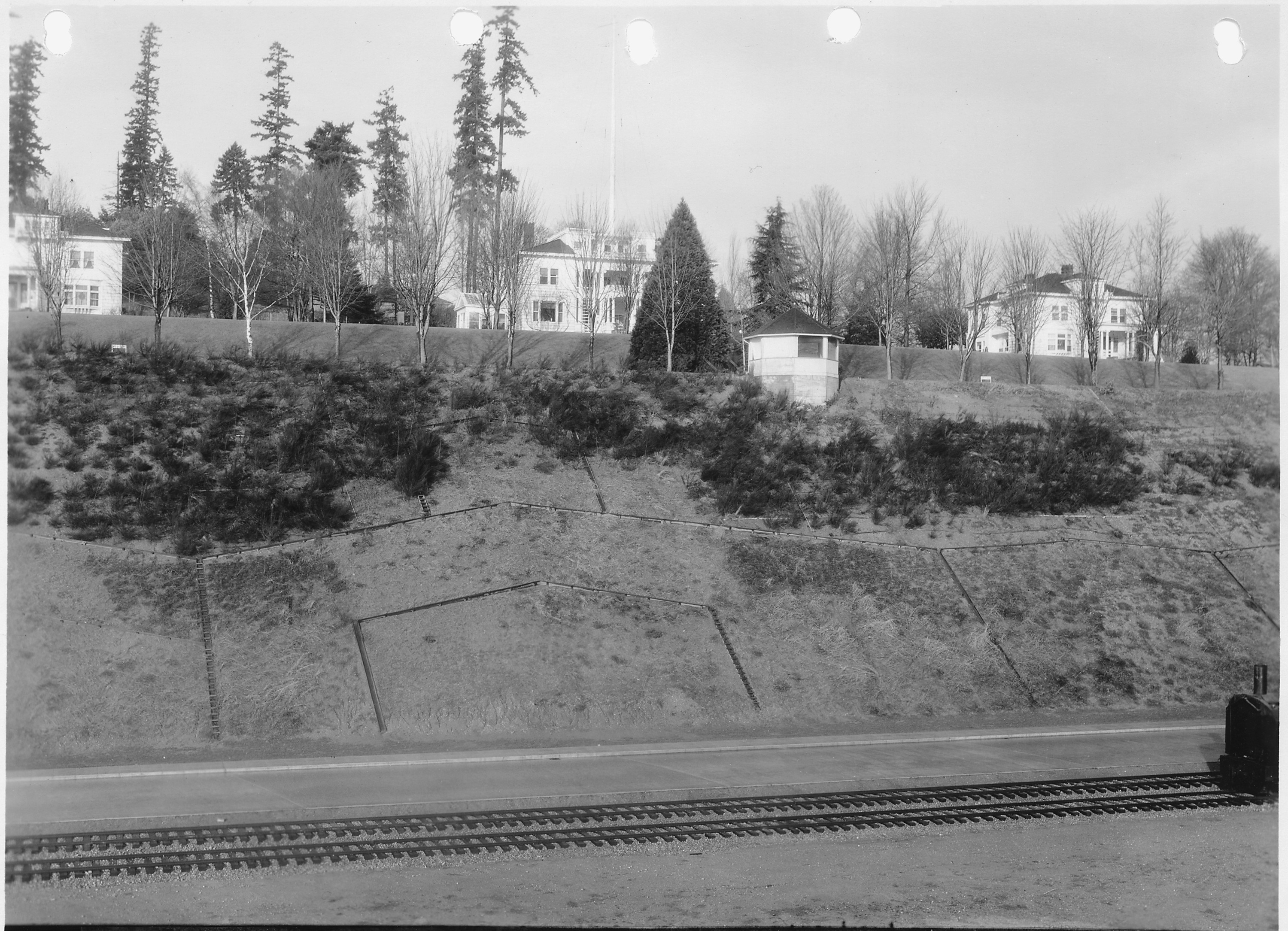
- Officers' Row atop the slope with the Band Stand, looking north.

- Location within Washington (state) Location within the United States
- Location: Roughly bounded by Mahan Ave., Decatur Ave., and Coghlan Rd., Bremerton, Washington
- Coordinates: 47.56208°N 122.63902°W
- Area: 13 acres (5.3 ha)
- Built: 1895
- Architect: Chamberlin & Siebrand
- Architectural style: Classical Revival
- MPS: Puget Sound Naval Shipyard Shore Facilities TR
- NRHP reference No.: 88003054
- Added to NRHP: July 16, 1990

The Officers' Row Historic District is a National Historic District in Bremerton, Washington. It was listed on the National Register of Historic Places in 1990. It represents the industrial function of Puget Sound Naval Shipyard Shore Facility.

Built between 1896 and 1913, the buildings were constructed to provide adequate housing for the officers responsible for the shipyard and industrial area. Officers' Quarters A, B, C, D and E were designed by the Seattle architectural firm of Chamberlin and Siebrand in 1896. This established the dominant architectural style in the shipyard. The homes form a line along the bluff overlooking the yard. As new quarters were needed, they were added into the line.

== Features ==
Each home has approximately five bedrooms. Architectural features include ornate lintels, oak hardwood floors, decorative fireplaces, wooden porches and pillars. The homes are maintained by Hunt Companies, the Navy's housing contractor.

== Puget Sound Naval Shipyard Historic Districts ==
The Puget Sound Naval Shipyard contains five historic districts:

1. Officers' Row Historic District
2. Puget Sound Radio Station Historic District
3. Hospital Reservation Historic District
4. Puget Sound Naval Shipyard Historic District
5. Marine Reservation Historic District.

These five units are a comprehensive representation of the historic features of the naval shipyard.
