= Eldon, Washington =

Unincorporated community Mason County, Washington

Eldon, Washington Hamma Hamma, Washington
- Unincorporated community
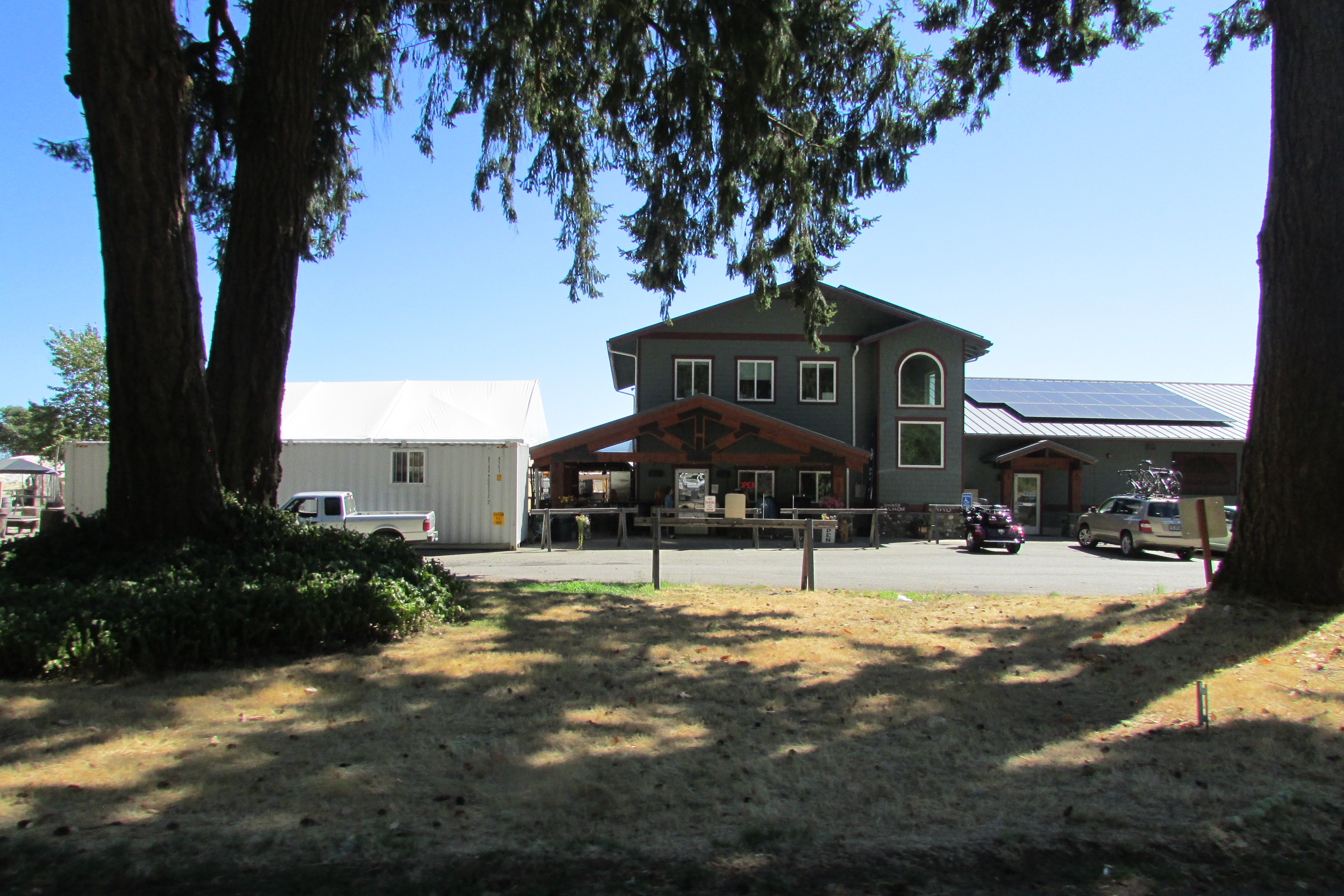
- Hama Hama Oyster Saloon in Eldon, Washington

- Location within Washington (state) Location within the United States
- Coordinates: 47°32′43″N 123°02′46″W
- Country: United States
- State: Washington
- County: Mason
- Elevation: 36 ft (11 m)
- Time zone: UTC-8 (Pacific (PST))
  - Summer (DST): UTC-7 (PDT)
- ZIP code: 98555
- GNIS feature ID: 1519237

Eldon is an unincorporated community in the U.S. State of Washington and part of Mason County. Eldon is located along U.S. Route 101 and sits on the mouth of the Hamma Hamma River.

The word Eldon is often considered a variation of the names "Aldin" or "Eldin," which typically mean "old friend," "wise protector," or "from the old settlement." Unlike the Hamma Hamma River located within the community, it is not tied to any local native languages.

== History ==
=== 1900-1950s ===
Eldon was a busy town in the early 1900s when logging operations were extensive on the upper Hamma Hamma River. A Civilian Conservation Corps (CCC) side camp was stationed near the river in the 1930s.

Between 1936-37, the CCC started construction of the Hamma Hamma Guard Station, also known as Hamma Hamma Cabin. The station was used as an administrative site for United States Forest Service fire and trail crews.

=== 1960s-Present ===
In 1999, there was a landslide known as the Eldon Slide that occurred south of the community. The slide covered U.S. Route 101 from mile mark 321.96 to 322.44. The Washington State Department of Transportation submitted an application for a Shoreline Management Permit. The permit was to construct a rock buttress with heavy loose riprap to contain the hillside. In addition, plans also called for the installation of horizontal drains to help shed excess water from the saturated hillside.

The 2018 Maple Fire occurred southwest of Brinnon in and near Eldon. The trees burned for almost 3 months and it cost $4.5 million to contain.

== Recreation ==
A convenience store named Eldon Store was built sometime before the time the Civilian Conservation Corps stationed near the river. It burned down in the later 1900's and was rebuilt and still stands today.

A restaurant named Hama Hama Oyster Saloon was established 1922 and still sells oysters today.

== See also ==
- Hamma Hamma River Bridges
