= Marine Reservation Historic District =

Historic district in Washington, United States

- U.S. National Register of Historic Places
- U.S. Historic district
- Location within Washington (state) Location within the United States
- Location: Bounded by Cole St., Dewey St., Decatur Ave., and Doyen St., Bremerton, Washington
- Coordinates: 47°33′48″N 122°38′43″W
- Area: 3.5 acres (1.4 ha)
- Built: 1910
- Architect: DeSibour, J.B.
- Architectural style: Colonial Revival
- MPS: Puget Sound Naval Shipyard Shore Facilities TR
- NRHP reference No.: 88003051
- Added to NRHP: July 16, 1990

The Marine Reservation Historic District is in the northwestern area of the Puget Sound Naval Shipyard, just west of the Hospital Reservation Historic District. Beginning in 1911 it reached its maximum development, prior to World War II. The district included four standing buildings and a barracks, which has been demolished. The barracks was a 3 1/2-story brick building similar in design to the other buildings. All of the buildings face the Marine parade ground, which is used as a playfield. The four two-story quarters of brick have Colonial Revival influences in the Georgian Colonial details. Quarters M-l, M-2 and M-3 were designed by Washington, D.C. architect J.H. DeDibour in 1910. The district is a man-made bench cut into the hillside. Each building has a front, side and rear lawn, native plantings and garden areas. The garages were built in the 1930s.

One year after the Puget Sound Naval Shipyard was established its founding commandant, Lieutenant Ambrose B. Wyckoff, requested a Marine detachment to provide yard security. It was not until 1896, however, that First Sergeant George Carter, along with twenty Marines, were sent to Bremerton. The Marine Reservation was established on what is now the corner of the yard bounded by Chester Avenue and the alley south of Burwell Street. By 1899, an officers quarters and barracks building had been constructed. Constructed between 1911 and 1914, the buildings in this district symbolize the role which the Marine Corps played as a security and training arm of the United States Navy, a function which began at the shipyard in 1896 and continued until 1977, when the function was moved to Subase Bangor.

== Puget Sound Naval Shipyard Historic Districts ==
The Puget Sound Naval Shipyard contains five historic districts:

1. Officers' Row Historic District;
2. Puget Sound Radio Station Historic District;
3. Hospital Reservation Historic District;
4. Puget Sound Naval Shipyard Historic District; and
5. Marine Reservation Historic District.

These five units are a comprehensive representation of the historic features of the naval shipyard.
