= Heron House =

Natural area in Washington, United States

The Heron House easement is an approximately 50-acre natural area protected by the Jefferson Land Trust on the Quilcene bay, including floodplain and tidelands, an estimated 1,300 ft of salt water frontage. It is located on the coast of Jefferson County, Washington, in north-west Washington state on the Olympic Peninsula. The conservation area was acquired in 2010. (Heron House: 47.825°N 122.871°W)

== See also ==
- Hood Canal
- Quilcene, Washington
- Big Quilcene Estuary
- Big Quilcene River
- Little Quilcene Estuary
- Little Quilcene River
- Donovan Creek Estuary
- Olympic Peninsula
