= Tarboo Unit =

The Tarboo Unit is a North Olympic Wildlife Area, managed by the Washington Department of Fish and Wildlife, that lies 4.5 miles northeast of Quilcene, Washington at the top of Tarboo Bay. It is located on the coast of Jefferson County on the Olympic Peninsula in northwest Washington state. The conservation natural area is home to both deciduous and conifer forests and supports protected species such as bald eagle, northern spotted owl, and marbled murrelet. (Tarboo Unit: 47.869668°N 122.818286°W)

== Species ==
Birds

- Birds of prey
- Eagles
- Marine birds
- Shorebirds
- Songbirds
- Upland birds
- Wading birds
- Waterfowl

Mammals

- Bear
- Deer
- Small mammals

Other

- Reptiles
- Amphibians

== See also ==
- Hood Canal
- Quilcene, Washington
- Big Quilcene Estuary
- Big Quilcene River
- Little Quilcene Estuary
- Little Quilcene River
- Donovan Creek Estuary
- Olympic Peninsula
