= Donovan Creek Estuary =

The Donovan Creek Estuary lies on the Quilcene Bay on the coast of Jefferson County, Washington in north-west Washington state on the Olympic Peninsula. (Donovan Creek Estuary: 47.828°N 122.856°W)

== Protected area ==
The Hood Canal Salmon Enhancement Group partnered with the JCCD, Jefferson Co., local property owners and the Washington Department of Fish and Wildlife to design, construct and manage the Donovan Creek Estuary restoration. The project permanently protects and restored 76 acres of the lower Donovan Creek coastal ecosystem in the upper Quilcene Bay.

== Species ==
Primary Species Benefiting

- Chum salmon

Secondary Species Benefiting

- Bull trout
- Chinook salmon
- Coho salmon
- Coastal cutthroat trout
- River lamprey
- Steelhead
- Other Wildlife

== See also ==
- Hood Canal
- Quilcene, Washington
- Big Quilcene Estuary
- Big Quilcene River
- Little Quilcene Estuary
- Little Quilcene River
- Olympic Peninsula
