= Big Quilcene Estuary =

Estuary in Washington, USA

The Big Quilcene Estuary lies on the Quilcene Bay on the coast of Jefferson County, Washington in north-west Washington state on the Olympic Peninsula. (Big Quilcene Estuary: 47.8177°N 122.8566°W)

== Protected area ==
The Hood Canal Salmon Enhancement Group partnered with the JCCD, Jefferson Co., local property owners and the Washington Department of Fish and Wildlife to restore manage the Big Quilcene Estuary. The project permanently protects and restored the mouth of the Big Quilcene River, removing 5,000 feet of levee to restore 40 acres of salt marsh with 3,000 feet of tidal channels in the Quilcene Bay.

== Species ==
Primary Species Benefiting

- Chum salmon

Secondary Species Benefiting

- Bull trout
- Chinook salmon
- Coho salmon
- Coastal cutthroat trout
- River lamprey
- Steelhead
- Other Wildlife

== See also ==
- Hood Canal
- Quilcene, Washington
- Big Quilcene River
- Donovan Creek Estuary
- Little Quilcene Estuary
- Little Quilcene River
- Olympic Peninsula
