= Little Quilcene Estuary =

The Little Quilcene Estuary lies on the Quilcene bay on the coast of Jefferson County, Washington in north-west Washington state on the Olympic Peninsula. (Little Quilcene Estuary: 47.8234°N 122.8589°W)

== Protected area ==
Just north of the town of Quilcene, the Little Quilcene River flows into the Quilcene Bay. It is 12.2 miles in length, and the combined estuary complex comprises an estimated 350 acres.

In 2009, a restoration project was completed to restore more natural estuarine function, removing approximately 700 feet of sea-dike from the eastern portion of the estuary and 1,500 feet of dike on the north side of the river. A bridge was also installed over Donovan Creek which also flows into the estuary complex of the Little Quilcene Estuary. The tidal and wave action, after the restoration, allowed fuller access to the entire northern portion of the larger Quilcene estuary.

== Species ==
Primary Species Benefiting

- Chum salmon

Secondary Species Benefiting

- Bull trout
- Chinook salmon
- Coho salmon
- Coastal cutthroat trout
- River lamprey
- Steelhead
- Other Wildlife

== See also ==
- Hood Canal
- Quilcene, Washington
- Big Quilcene Estuary
- Big Quilcene River
- Donovan Creek Estuary
- Little Quilcene River
- Olympic Peninsula
