= Quilcene National Fish Hatchery =

Fish hatchery in Washington, United States

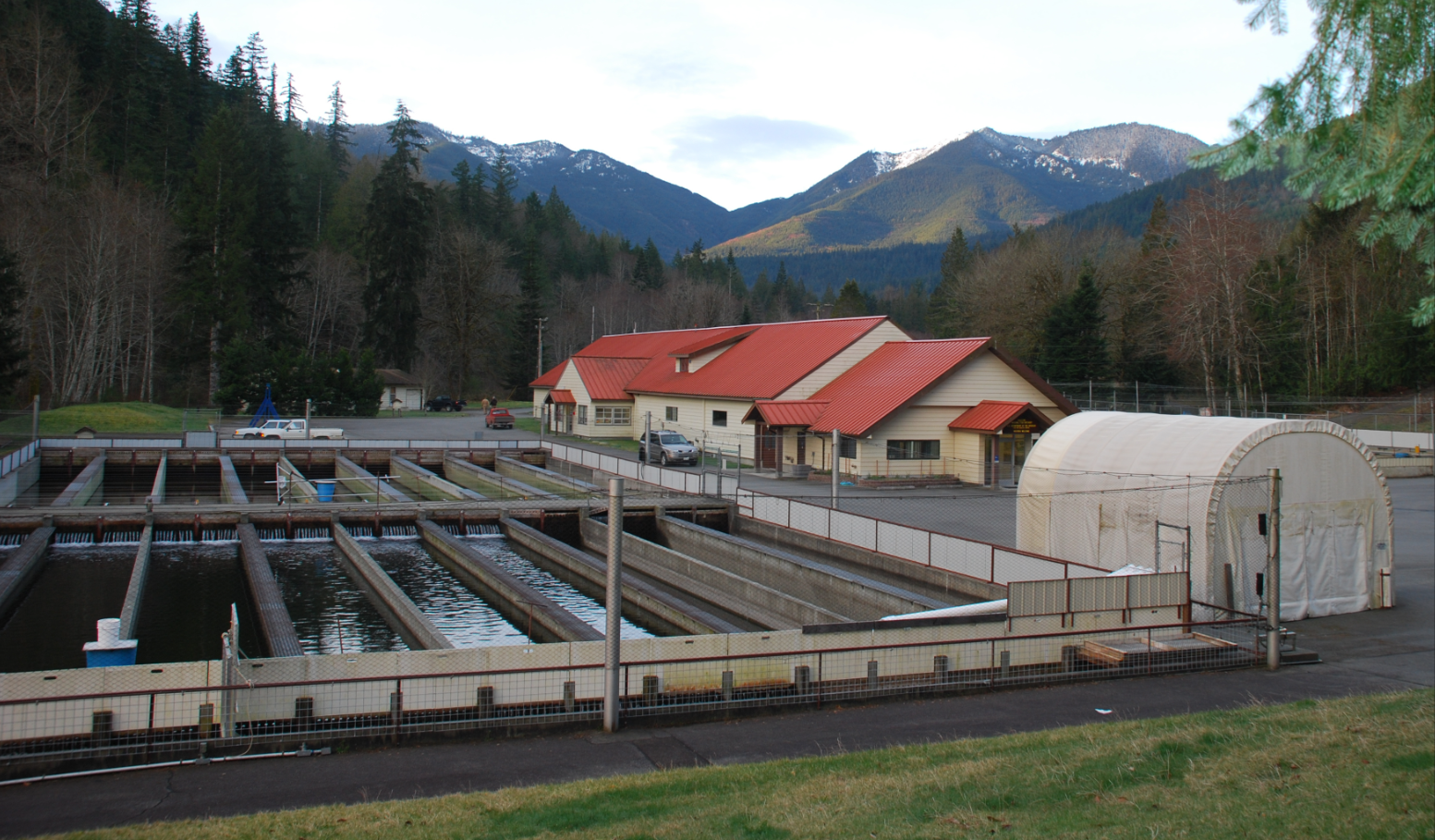
- The buildings and raceways of the Quilcene National Fish Hatchery.

- Location within Washington (state) Location within the United States
- Location: Quilcene, Washington, United States
- Coordinates: 47°48′35.5″N 122°54′48.53″W
- Established: 1911
- Governing body: United States Fish and Wildlife Service
- Website: www.fws.gov/fish-hatchery/quilcene

The Quilcene National Fish Hatchery is a fish hatchery located in Quilcene, Washington, in the United States. It is co-managed by the United States Fish and Wildlife Service and five Native American tribes. Like other components of the National Fish Hatchery System, the hatchery's mission is to conserve, protect, and enhance fish, wildlife, plants, and their habitats, as well to cooperate with like-minded partners to further these goals. Its specific purpose is to fulfill a United States Government treaty obligation to support fisheries of economic and cultural importance to Native Americans by producing fish which it stocks in Native American tribal waters in western Washington.

== History ==
The Quilcene National Fish Hatchery was constructed in 1911 and began operations that year. It was a component of the United States Bureau of Fisheries until 1940, when the Bureau of Fisheries merged with other agencies to form the United States Department of the Interior's Fish and Wildlife Service, which in 1956 underwent a major reorganization to become the United States Fish and Wildlife Service. Since it opened, the hatchery has undergone expansion and improvement many times, and it has raised a variety of species: At various times, it has raised brook trout (Salvelinus fontinalis), Chinook salmon (Oncorhynchus tshawytscha), chum salmon (Oncorhynchus keta), coho salmon (Oncorhynchus kisutch), cutthroat trout (Oncorhynchus clarkii), pink salmon (Oncorhynchus gorbuscha), rainbow trout (Oncorhynchus mykiss), and sockeye salmon (Oncorhynchus nerka). The hatchery distributed these fish into streams and rivers flowing into Hood Canal and the Strait of Juan de Fuca.

== Management ==
The USFWS, Lower Elwha Klallam Tribe, Jamestown S'Klallam Tribe, Port Gamble S'Klallam Tribe, Skokomish Indian Tribe, and Suquamish Tribe co-manage the Quilcene National Fish Hatchery. It is a component of the Puget Sound/Olympic Peninsula National Fish Hatchery Complex, which also includes the Makah National Fish Hatchery, the Quinault National Fish Hatchery, and the Western Washington Fish and Wildlife Conservation Office.

== Activities ==
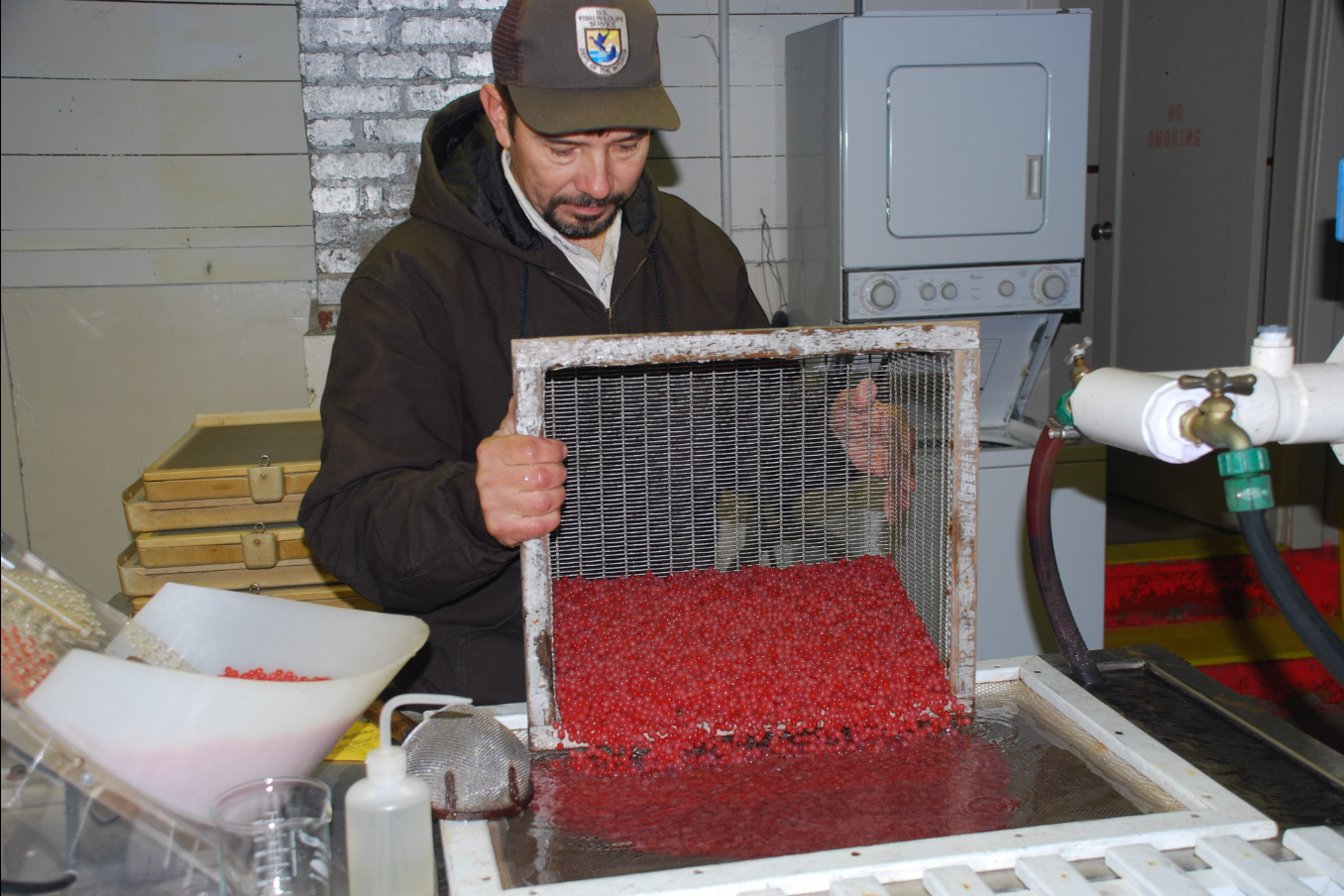
A hatchery employee transfers coho salmon eggs

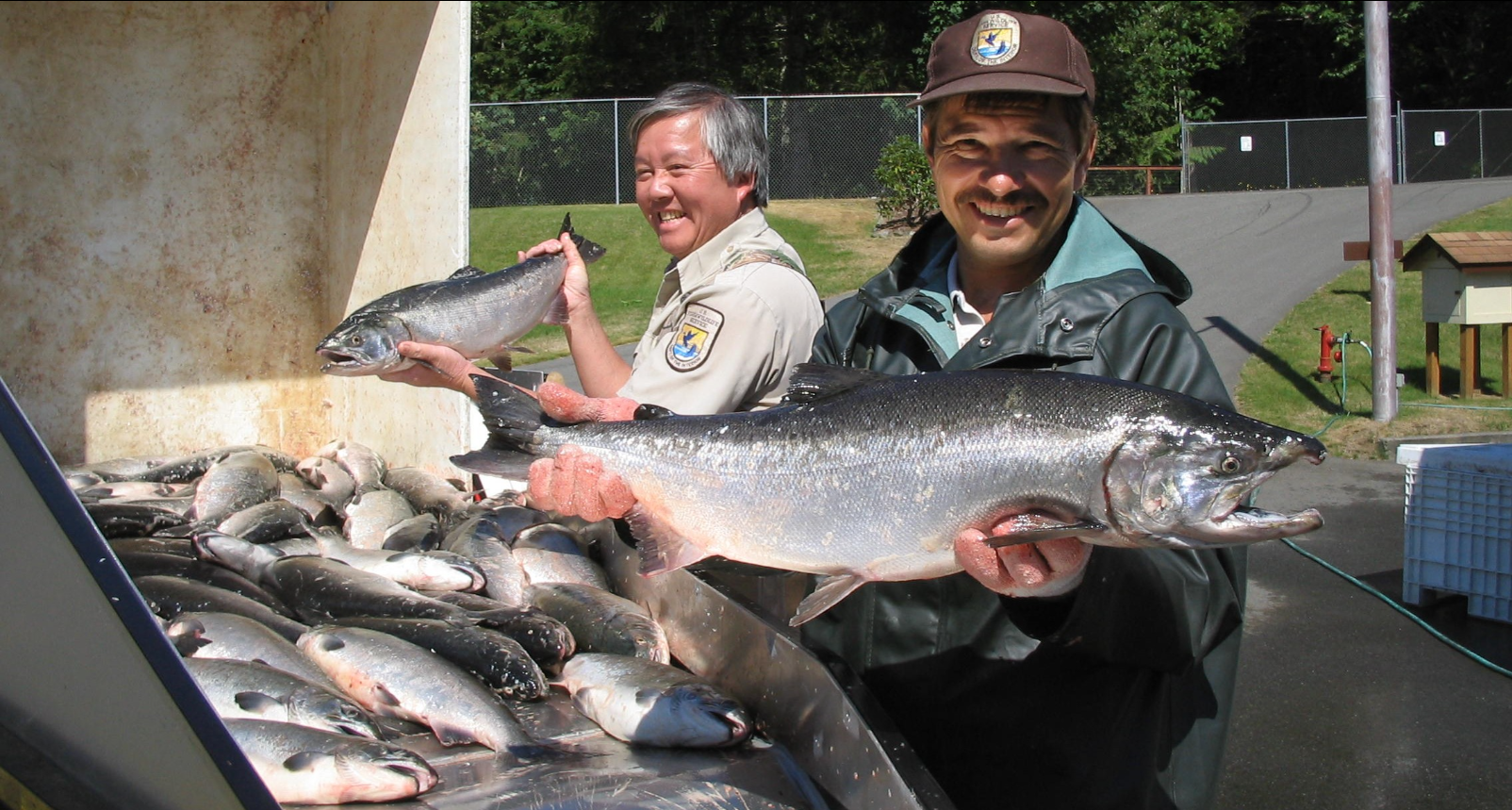
Hatchery employees handle returning adult coho salmon

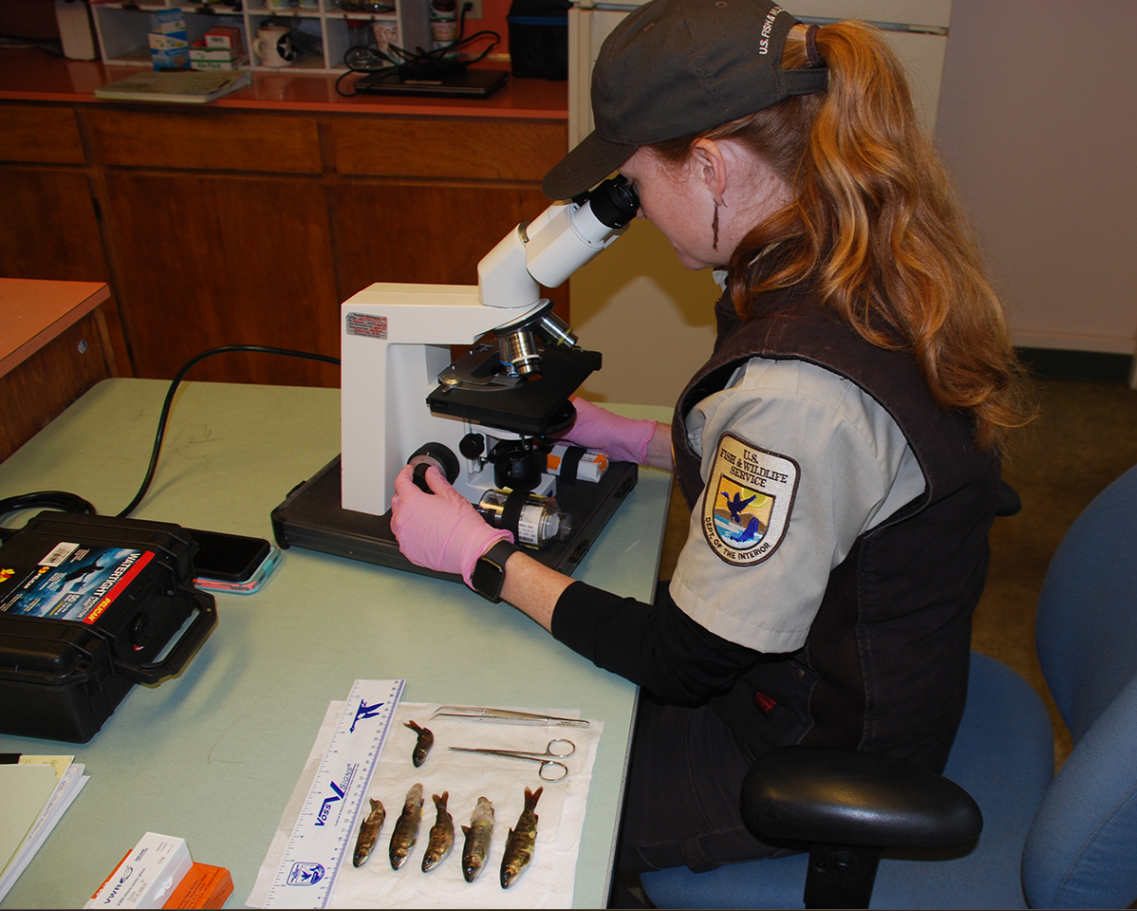
Fish health sampling at the hatchery

As of 2025, the Quinault National Fish Hatchery's sole focus was on producing coho salmon (Oncorhynchus kisutch) to fulfill a U.S. Government treaty obligation to stock local Native American tribal waters for economic and cultural purposes as well as to support the commercial fishing and sport fishing industries in the area and maintain the ecosystem in the Big Quilcene River watershed. The hatchery releases either about 400,000 or about 600,000 (according to different sources) coho salmon into the Big Quilcene River every April. It also annually provides 600,000 developing coho salmon eggs to the Port Gamble S'Klallam Tribe's pen net program. The hatchery partners with other USFWS offices, the Washington Department of Fish and Wildlife, and nonprofit organizations to collaborate in achieving common goals. These collaborative efforts include annual hatchery evaluations, developing hatchery management strategies, and adjusting production to account for changing habitat and water quality conditions that affect fish populations.

The coho salmon raised at the hatchery are anadromous, meaning that after hatching and growing in streams they migrate into the open ocean, where they spend their adulthood before returning to their birthplace, or natal stream, to spawn. Typically, the fish spend about 18 months at sea before returning to their natal streams, which in the case of hatchery-raised fish are the hatchery's tanks. The fish begin to return to the hatchery each year in August.

The hatchery staff allows some of the adult fish to proceed upstream to spawn naturally, removes others to provide them to Native Americans for cultural use, and holds the rest in holding tanks until the females are ready to spawn at the beginning of October. During spawning events, hatchery employees sort the fish based on maturity and sex, then remove eggs from the females, fertilize and clean the eggs, and place the eggs into incubation trays. Some embryos die before hatching, but after about 30 days, the surviving fish embryos "eye up," i.e., develop visible eyes, which allows the hatchery's staff to identify and remove dead embryos and count the surviving "eyed-up" eggs. About 10 days later, or 40 days after initial fertilization, the "eyed-up" eggs hatch into baby fish known as alevin.

The alevin remain in the incubation trays for an additional 65 days or until they have fully absorbed their yolk sacs, after which they are known as "fry". While the time from initial fertilization to the fry stage usually takes about 105 days, the time varies depending on water temperature. The hatchery's staff moves the fry into large tanks and feeds them several times a day, monitoring their growth throughout the year, removing uneaten food and waste from the tanks, and splitting the fry into additional tanks when crowding occurs.

The hatchery staff marks and tags most of the fish with fin clips, which allow both scientists and the public to distinguish between hatchery-raised fish and fish that hatched in the wild. The tags include a code which allows the hatchery's scientists to determine the hatchery and year of origin of each fish, providing information that helps hatchery managers make more informed decisions about hatchery operations.

The hatchery releases coho salmon directly into the Big Quilcene River each April, coinciding with the salmon reaching the smolt phase of their life cycle, when their bodies are ready to adapt to the salt water environment of the ocean. The coho smolt then have a short journey of 5 miles (8 km) to reach the brackish water of the estuary within the Hood Canal on their way to the open sea.

At all times of the year, the hatchery's staff routinely tests water quality for temperature, oxygen, pH, and nitrates to keep the fish within their ideal ranges for these physical and chemical conditions. Veterinarians work with the hatchery's managers to prevent outbreaks of disease among the fish—thus avoiding the use of treatments, and especially of antibiotics, to the greatest extent possible—and to treat disease outbreaks that do occur. The hatchery's staff—some of whom reside at the hatchery—also maintains the facility's water intake, pumping, distribution, and waste treatment system, and is on call to respond to emergencies imposed by adverse weather, power outages, and infrastructure failure that could kill the eggs and fish.

== Recreation ==
The Quilcene National Fish Hatchery lies in a narrow valley in a scenic area on the east side of the Olympic Peninsula and is a popular tourist destination. It is open to the public on weekdays. The hatchery's one-room visitor center offers information about the hatchery's operations, the fish it raises, and the cultural relevance of the fish to Native Americans. Visitors also are permitted to walk around the facility to see its fish ponds, its fish ladder, its fishing weir, and the Big Quilcene River. The hatchery offers guided tours to interested groups.

No trails exist on the hatchery's grounds. However, a trail leads from a public parking lot adjacent to the hatchery to the Big Quilcene River downriver of the hatchery's fishing weir. Recreational fishing is permitted in the river.

== See also ==
- National Fish Hatchery System
- List of National Fish Hatcheries in the United States
