= Quinault National Fish Hatchery =

Fish hatchery in Washington, United States

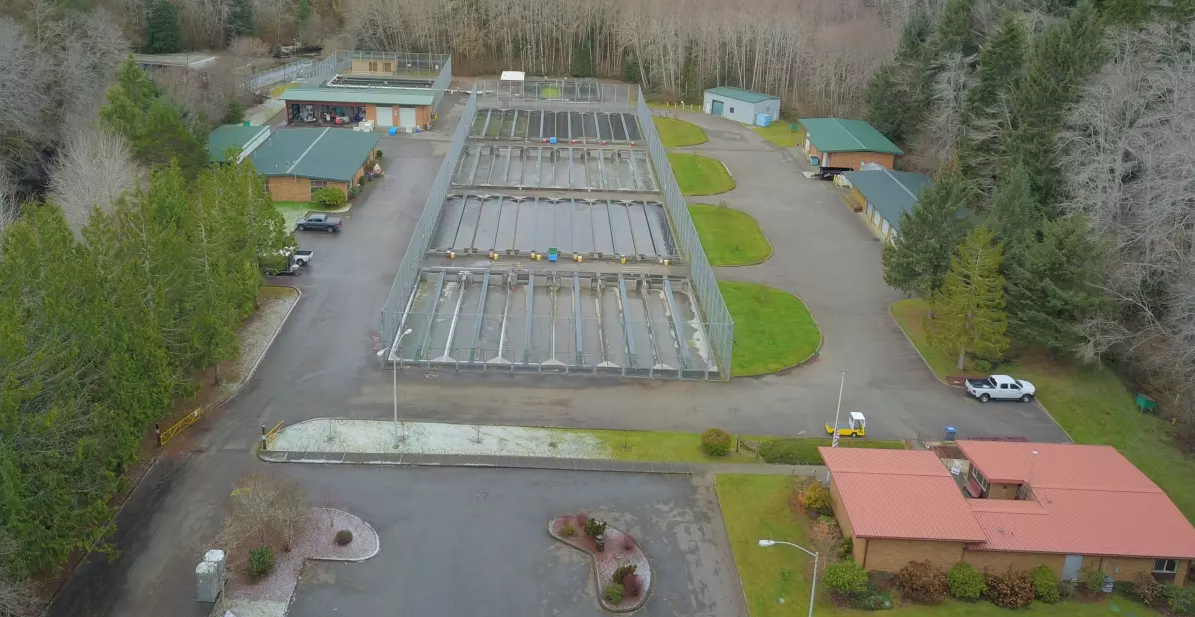
- The buildings and raceways of the Quinault National Fish Hatchery.

- Location within Washington (state) Location within the United States
- Location: Humptulips, Washington, United States
- Coordinates: 47.35928711150789°N 123.99157319787581°W
- Established: November 1968
- Named for: Quinault Indian Nation
- Governing body: United States Fish and Wildlife Service
- Website: www.fws.gov/fish-hatchery/quinault

The Quinault National Fish Hatchery is a fish hatchery located in Humptulips, Washington, in the United States. It is co-managed by the United States Fish and Wildlife Service and the Quinault Indian Nation. Like other components of the National Fish Hatchery System, the hatchery's mission is to conserve, protect, and enhance fish, wildlife, plants, and their habitats, as well to cooperate with like-minded partners to further these goals. Its specific purpose is to produce fish which are stocked in Native American tribal waters in western Washington.

== History ==
By the early 1960s, runs of salmon (family Salmonidae) and steelhead (Oncorhynchus mykiss) were in decline on lands within and adjacent to the Quinault Indian Reservation. A treaty requirement obliged the United States Government to restore runs of the fish on those lands. In 1963, the United States Fish and Wildlife Service (USFWS) conducted a study in cooperation with the U.S. Government's Bureau of Indian Affairs and the Quinault Indian Tribal Council to determine a location in western Washington for a component of the National Fish Hatchery System that could support fisheries of economic and cultural importance to the Quinault people. After exploring many of the rivers and creeks in the area, the Quinault tribal chairman identified the site of the new hatchery by saying "here" and making a mark on a tree alongside Cook Creek, a tributary of the Quinault River near Olympic National Park. The United States Congress approved funds for planning and site acquisition for a hatchery on the site in 1964. The hatchery began production of fall chinook salmon (Oncorhynchus tshawytscha) and coho salmon (Oncorhynchus kisutch) in November 1968.

== Management ==
The USFWS and the Quinault Indian Nation co-manage the Quinault National Fish Hatchery. It is a component of the Puget Sound/Olympic Peninsula National Fish Hatchery Complex, which also includes the Makah National Fish Hatchery, the Quilcene National Fish Hatchery, and the Western Washington Fish and Wildlife Conservation Office.

== Activities ==
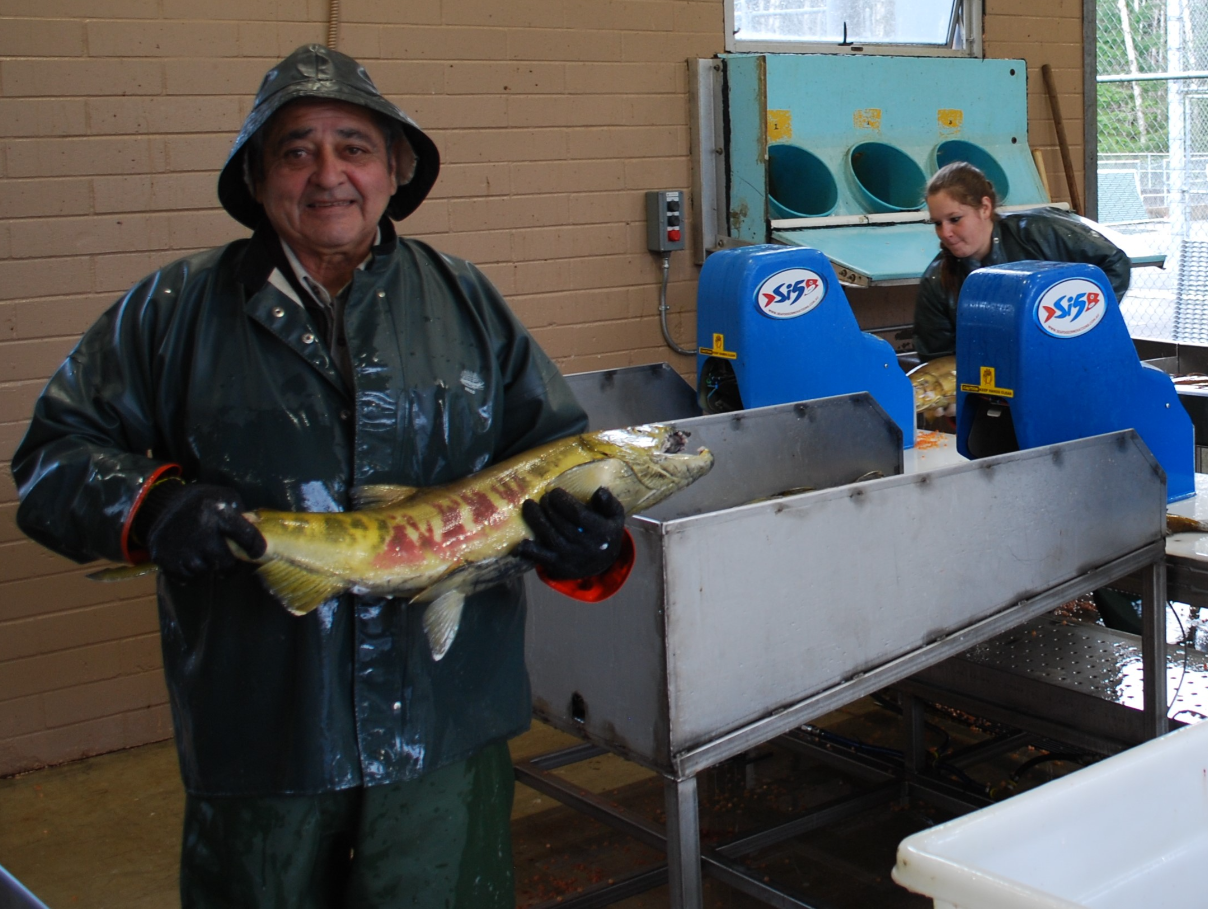
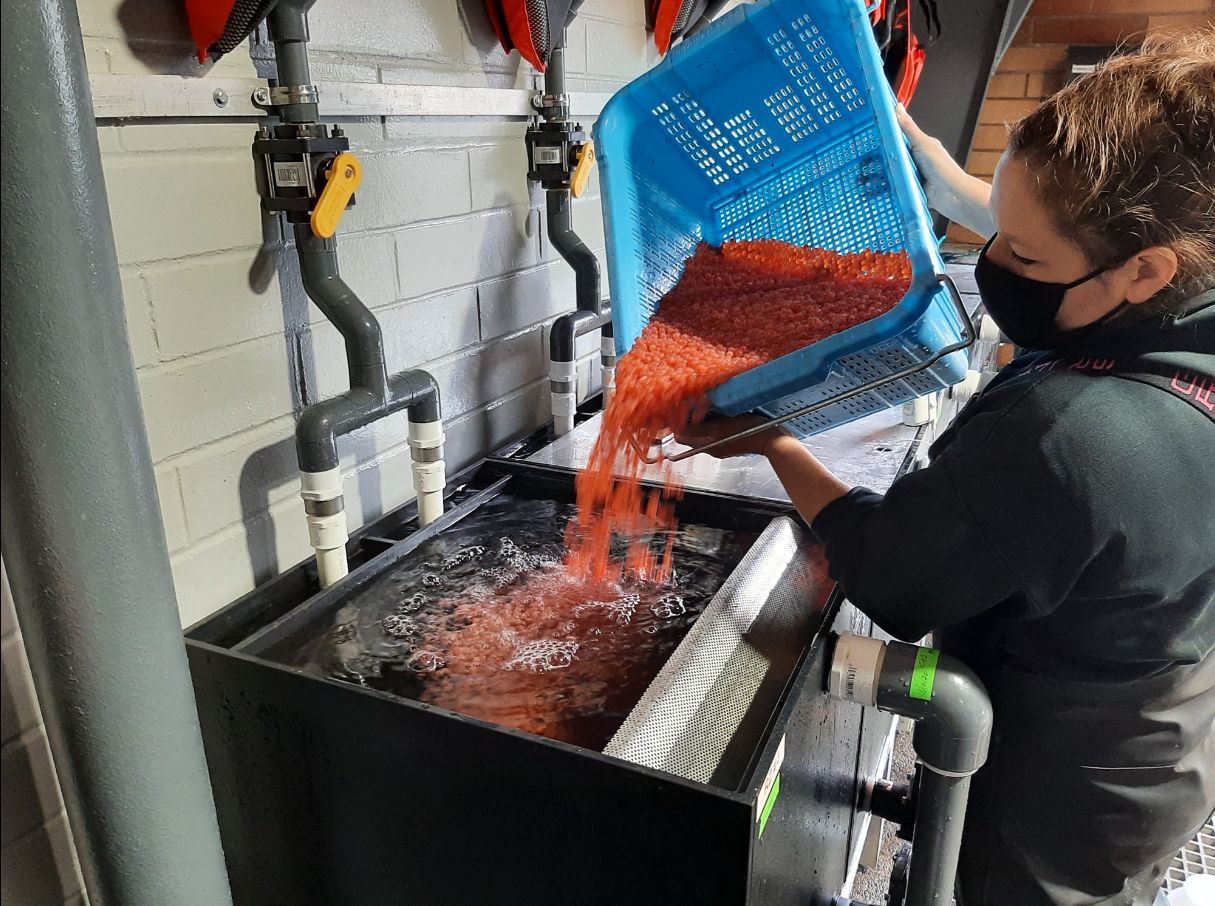
LEFT: The hatchery's staff spawns chum salmon (Oncorhynchus keta) on September 14, 2021.
RIGHT: A hatchery employee transfers fertilized coho salmon (Oncorhynchus kisutch) eggs to an incubator.
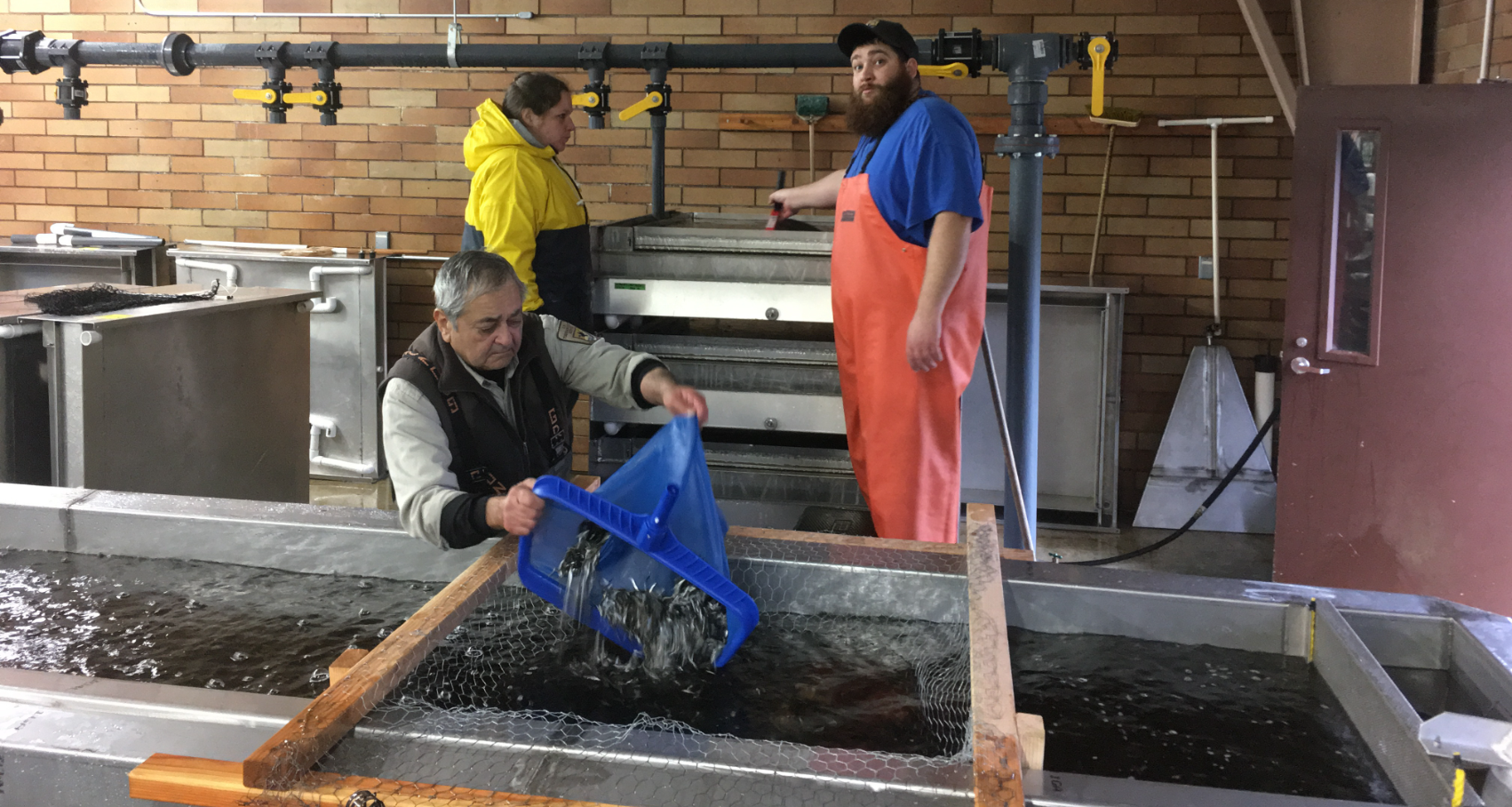
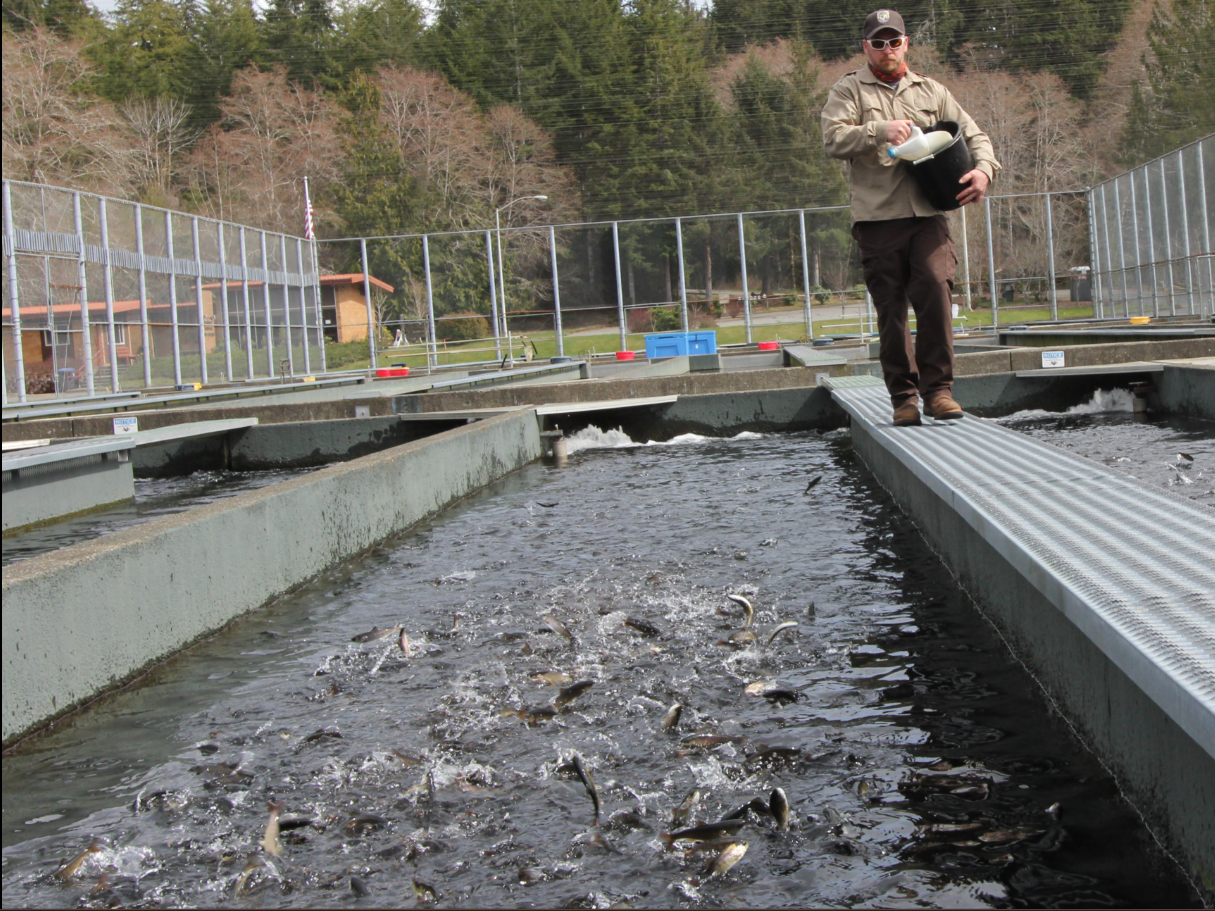
LEFT: The hatchery's staff transfers chum salmon (Oncorhynchus keta) fry to a new tank.
RIGHT: A hatchery employee feeds steelhead (Oncorhynchus mykiss) fry in a raceway.

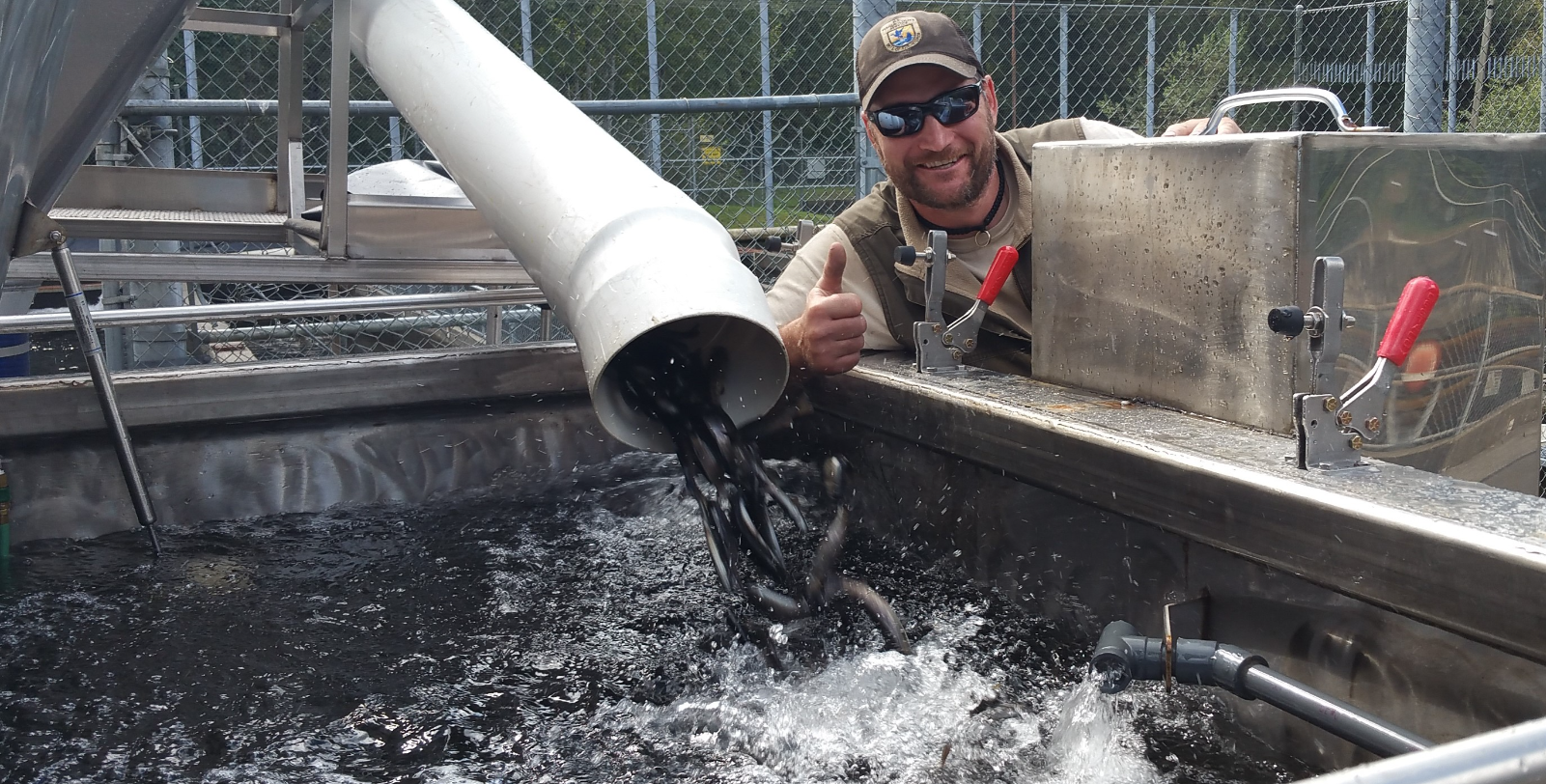
A hatchery employee transfers steelhead (Oncorhynchus mykiss) for delivery to the Quinault Indian Nation net pen program.

The Quinault National Fish Hatchery conducts fisheries research and hatchery evaluations of fish populations and environmental conditions, and uses this information to establish a consensus between the USFWS and the Quinault Indian Nation as to what species to raise and in what numbers, as well as when to release the fish. As of 2025, the hatchery raises chum salmon (Oncorhynchus keta), coho salmon, and winter steelhead and releases approximately three million fish annually.

The species raised at the hatchery are anadromous, meaning that after hatching and growing in streams they migrate into the open ocean, where they spend their adulthood before returning to their birthplace to spawn. The hatchery holds the returning adults in holding ponds until they are ready to spawn. During spawning events, hatchery employees sort the fish based on species, maturity, and sex, then remove eggs from the females, fertilize and clean the eggs, and place the eggs into incubation trays. Some embryos die before hatching, but after about 30 days, the surviving fish embryos "eye up," i.e., develop visible eyes, which allows the hatchery's staff to identify and remove dead embryos and count the surviving "eyed-up" eggs. About 10 days later, or 40 days after initial fertilization, the "eyed-up" eggs hatch into baby fish known as alevin.

The alevin remain in the incubation trays for an additional 65 days or until they have fully absorbed their yolk sacs, after which they are known as "fry". While the time from initial fertilization to the fry stage usually takes about 105 days, the time varies depending on species and water temperature. The hatchery's staff moves the fry into large tanks and feeds them several times a day, monitoring their growth throughout the year, removing uneaten food and waste from the tanks, and splitting the fry into additional tanks when crowding occurs.

The hatchery staff marks and tags most of the coho salmon and steelhead with fin clips, which allow both scientists and the public to distinguish between hatchery-raised fish and fish that hatched in the wild. The tags include a code which allows the hatchery's scientists to determine the hatchery and year of origin of each fish, providing information that helps hatchery managers make more informed decisions about hatchery operations.

The hatchery releases chum salmon and steelhead into Cook Creek, a tributary of the Quinault River. It releases coho salmon directly into the Big Quilcene River each spring, coinciding with the salmon reaching the smolt phase of their life cycle, when their bodies are ready to adapt to the salt water environment of the ocean. The coho smolt then have a short journey of 5 miles (8 km) to reach the brackish water of the estuary within the Hood Canal on their way to the open sea.

At all times of the year, the hatchery's staff routinely tests water quality for temperature, oxygen, pH, and nitrates to keep the fish within their ideal ranges for these physical and chemical conditions. Veterinarians work with the hatchery's managers to prevent outbreaks of disease among the fish — thus avoiding the use of treatments, and especially of antibiotics, to the greatest extent possible — and to treat disease outbreaks that do occur. The hatchery's staff — some of whom reside at the hatchery — also maintains the facility's water intake, pumping, distribution, and waste treatment system, and is on call to respond to emergencies imposed by adverse weather, power outages, and infrastructure failure that could kill the eggs and fish.

== Recreation ==
The Quinault National Fish Hatchery lies on the Olympic Peninsula and is a popular tourist destination. It has a visitor center which offers self-guided tours that provide information about the hatchery's operations, the fish it raises, and the cultural relevance of the fish to the Quinault people. Visitors also are permitted to walk around the facility to see its fish ponds, its fish ladder, its fishing weir, and Cook Creek. Recreational fishing is permitted in Cook Creek.

== See also ==
- National Fish Hatchery System
- List of National Fish Hatcheries in the United States
