= Quilcene River =

Quilcene River may refer to:

- Big Quilcene River, a river in Jefferson County, Washington, in the United States
- Little Quilcene River, a river in Clallam and Jefferson counties in Washington in the United States
