= Seabeck, Washington =

- Census-designated place
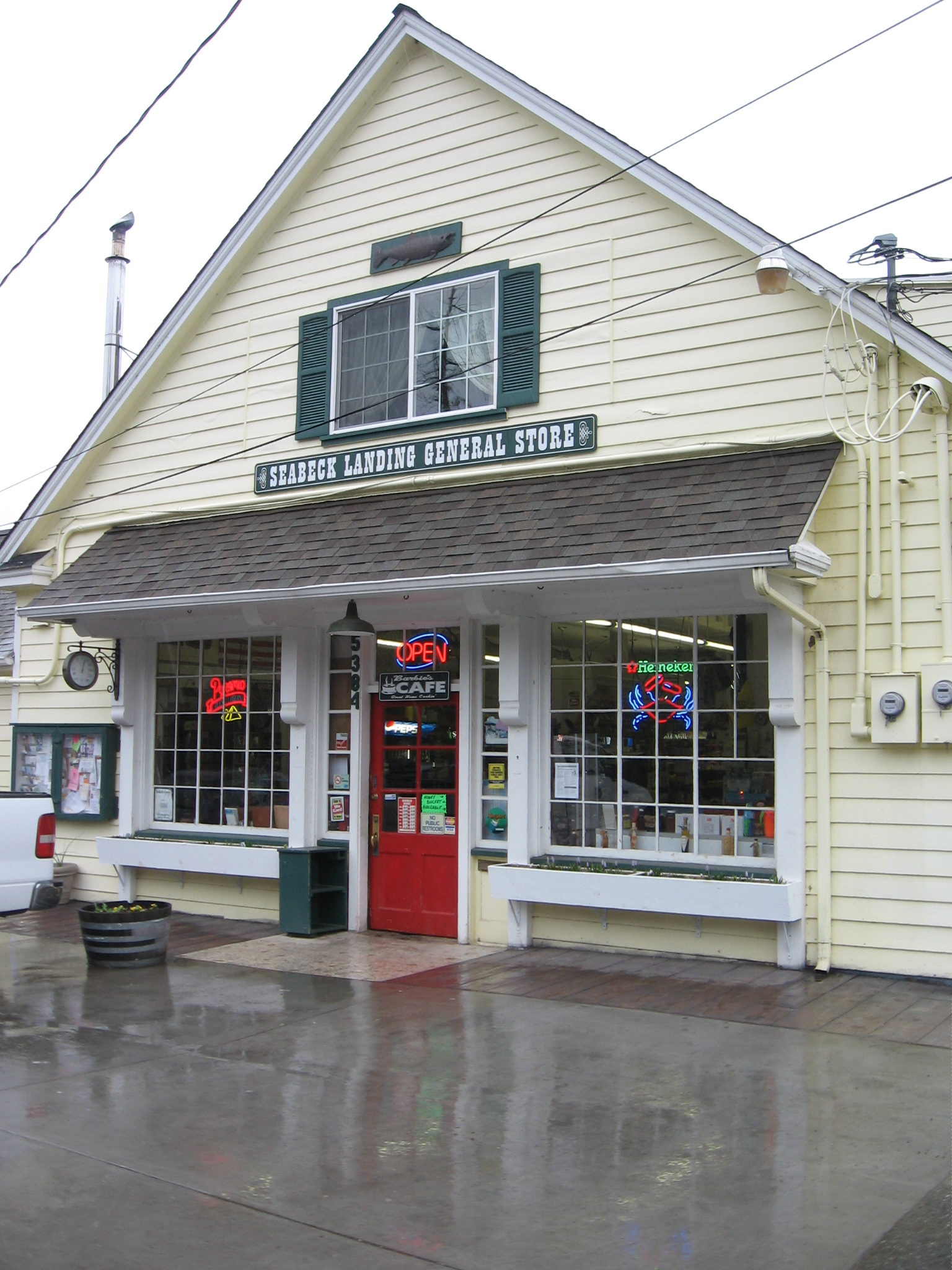

- Location in Washington and the United States Seabeck (the United States)
- Coordinates: 47°38′44″N 122°49′28″W
- Country: United States
- State: Washington
- County: Kitsap

Area
  - Total: 4.2 sq mi (11.0 km^{2})
  - Land: 3.3 sq mi (8.6 km^{2})
  - Water: 0.93 sq mi (2.4 km^{2})
- Elevation: 0 ft (0 m)

Population (2010)
  - Total: 1,105
  - Density: 333/sq mi (128.4/km^{2})
- Time zone: UTC-8 (Pacific (PST))
  - Summer (DST): UTC-7 (PDT)
- ZIP Code: 98380
- Area code(s): 360, 564
- FIPS code: 53-62120
- GNIS feature ID: 2585034

Seabeck is an unincorporated community and census-designated place (CDP) in Kitsap County, Washington, United States. The population was 1,105 at the 2010 census Seabeck is a former mill town on Hood Canal. and had increased to 1,143 by the 2020 census.

== Etymology ==
The name "Seabeck" comes from the Twana /ɬqábaqʷ/, from /ɬ-/, "far", /qab/, "smooth, calm", and /-aqʷ/, "water".

In his narrative of his voyage down the Hood Canal in 1792, Captain George Vancouver made no mention of the Seabeck area. The first known use of the place name "Seabeck" dates from the United States Exploring Expedition of 1838 to 1842. On May 16, 1841, Captain Charles Wilkes of the expedition ordered Lieutenant Augustus Case to take four boats and survey the Hood Canal. Wilkes wrote of the strait:

Hoods Canal branches off from Admiralty Inlet at Suquamish Head, where it is two miles wide. Its direction is south-southeast, five miles; it then turns to the south-southwest, six miles; thence to Squaller's Point, southeast, six miles, turning again to the west-southwest, three miles to Nukolowap Point, south point to Toandons Peninsula, which divides the north branch from the canal. Continuing on this course across the mouth of the north branch, for four miles, is Quatsap Point, passing the harbor and point of Scabock [sic.] Harbor on the east then southwest, three miles to Triton Head ...

== History ==
Seabeck was founded in 1856 by Marshall Blinn and William Adams, doing business as the Washington Mill Company. Their lumber was in such demand they built a second mill, then a shipyard to build boats to haul the lumber to California, which had high demand due to the California Gold Rush. Eventually, along with four saloons, the town had two general stores and two hotels. In 1876, there were over 400 people living in Seabeck. After decades of success, in the 1880s the demand had eased, and most of the easily accessible trees had been harvested. In August 1886 a spark from the ship Retriever started a fire that consumed both mills, along with other buildings. Rumors flew that the mills would not be re-built, so most residents moved to other towns with mills, notably Port Hadlock, turning Seabeck into a virtual ghost town. In 1914, the old townsite was purchased by Laurence Colman and revived as a retreat for Puget Sound's YMCA & YWCA clubs, and eventually all non-profit groups. Several surviving buildings from the 1850s-60s were refurbished and today form the campus of the Seabeck Conference Center.

Seabeck is a mostly rural area, consisting primarily of the conference center across the road and lagoon from the general store, coffee shop, antique store, a pizza parlor and Olympic View Marina. There are houses and a now-demolished elementary school that served the areas around Seabeck. The population was 1,105 at the 2010 census.

Seabeck is the hometown of figure skater Ashley Wagner.

=== Shipbuilding ===
Under the direction of William J. Adams, the Washington Mill Company undertook the role of a shipyard, constructing vessels for a brief period of time in the late 1800s. In total, the Washington Mill Company is responsible for creating at least seven vessels of varying type within the city of Seabeck.

==== Constructed ships ====
- Georgia – 1872, steamer
- Cassandra Adams – 1876, sail
- Richard Holyoke – 1877, tug
- Olympus – 1879, sail
- Mary Winkleman – 1881, sail
- Retriever – 1881, sail
- Louise – 1884, steamer

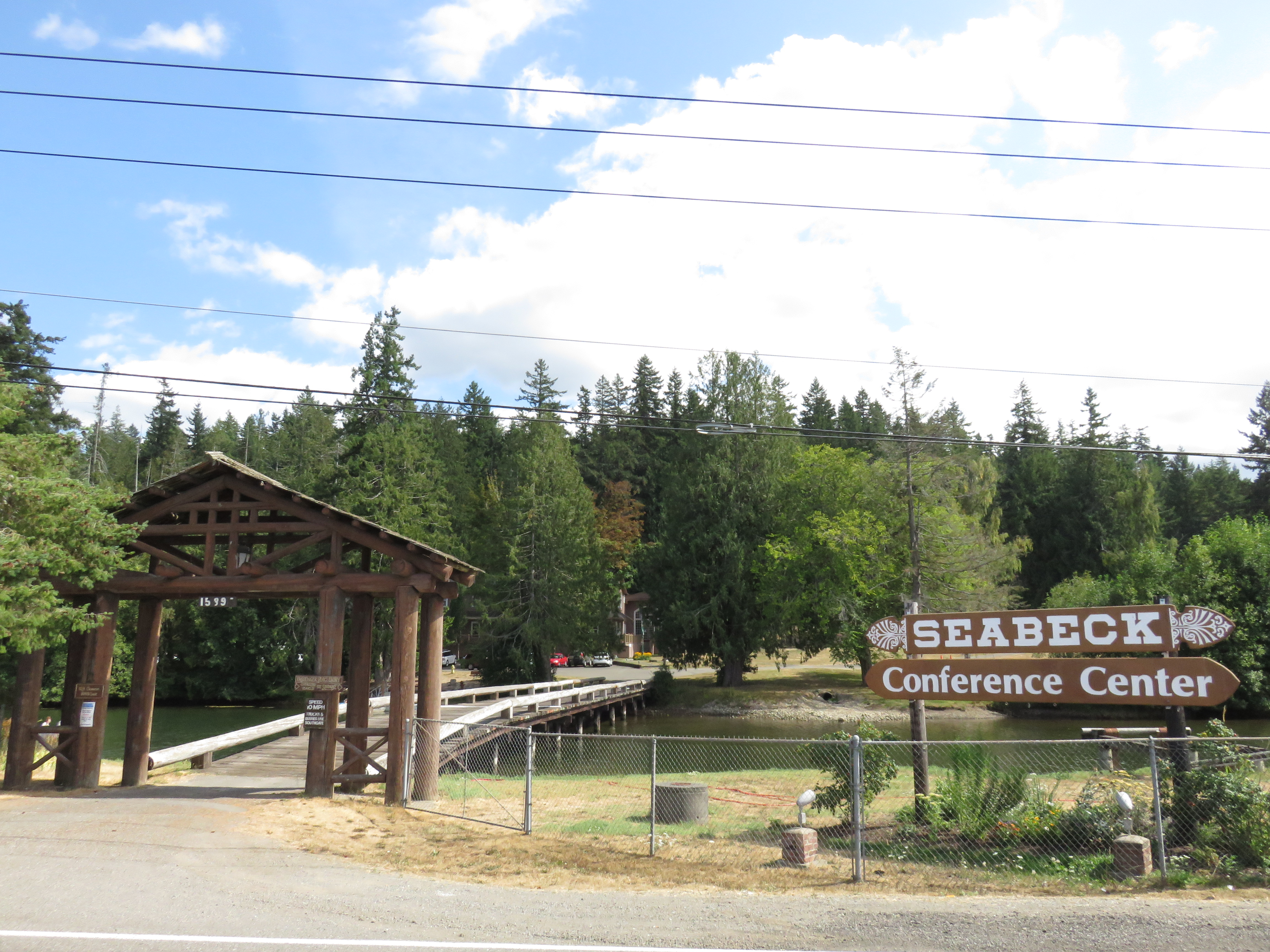
The gate and bridge over the lagoon that is the entrance to the Seabeck Conference Center (August 2017)

== Geography ==
Seabeck is in western Kitsap County, along the southeastern shore of Hood Canal. It is 15 miles (24 km) northwest of Bremerton. The village of Seabeck is in the center of the Seabeck CDP, which extends east to Big Beef Creek and west to Stavis Bay. Scenic Beach State Park is in the western part of the CDP. Lake William Symington is directly south, a few kilometers away from the southern boundaries of the city.

According to the U.S. Census Bureau, the Seabeck CDP has a total area of 4.2 square miles (11.0 km^{2}), of which 3.3 square miles (8.6 km^{2}) are land and 0.93 square miles (2.4 km^{2}), or 21.85%, are water.

== Demographics ==
Historical population
Census	Pop.	Note	%±
2010	1,105		—
2020	1,143		3.4%
U.S. Decennial Census; 2000 2010

Seabeck first appeared as a census designated place in the 2010 U.S. census.

=== Racial and ethnic composition ===
Seabeck CDP, Washington – Racial and ethnic composition Note: the US Census treats Hispanic/Latino as an ethnic category. This table excludes Latinos from the racial categories and assigns them to a separate category. Hispanics/Latinos may be of any race.
Race / Ethnicity (NH = Non-Hispanic)	Pop 2010	Pop 2020	% 2010	% 2020
White alone (NH)	1,002	955	90.68%	83.55%
Black or African American alone (NH)	6	12	0.54%	1.05%
Native American or Alaska Native alone (NH)	9	6	0.81%	0.52%
Asian alone (NH)	20	19	1.81%	1.66%
Native Hawaiian or Pacific Islander alone (NH)	0	2	0.00%	0.17%
Other race alone (NH)	1	17	0.09%	1.49%
Mixed race or Multiracial (NH)	29	76	2.62%	6.65%
Hispanic or Latino (any race)	38	56	3.44%	4.90%
Total	1,105	1,143	100.00%	100.00%

== Notable places ==
=== Seabeck Conference Center ===
In the early 1900s, Laurence Colman and Arn Allen of Seattle formed a partnership to build a facility for YMCA and YWCA groups to hold summer conferences. In 1914, Lawrence Coleman and his brother George purchased much of the original Seabeck site. In 1936, Laurence Colman's son, Ken Colman, incorporated the conference grounds as a private, nonprofit corporation. He deeded to the corporation the 90 acres (36 ha) that now make up Seabeck Conference Center. The center is available for events during the year. For over thirty years, the Seattle Lighthouse for the Blind has held its annual retreat there, hosting deaf-blind visitors from across the nation and world.

=== Seabeck Elementary ===
The town's primary school, Seabeck Elementary, offered kindergarten through sixth grade. It had a long and locally significant history and thus was supported by the community. The school closed at the end of the 2006-07 school year. Demolition of the old school building started in autumn of 2019, and is planned to become the new location of the area's fire department. The school gym, which was built separate from the school in 1990, will remain standing. The field and track will also remain open, and both are available for use and open to community recreation.

In 2021 the newly formed Seabeck Community Center began operations on the site, using the renovated school-gym building, and featuring a farmers' market during the summer months.

=== Seabeck Cemetery ===
The Seabeck Cemetery lies in the woods of Seabeck near the elementary school. It is a popular attraction among locals due to its antiquity that is only locally challenged by the Buena Vista Cemetery in Port Gamble.

=== Scenic Beach State Park ===
The 88-acre (36 ha) Scenic Beach State Park in the western part of the CDP began as the Emel family's homesite in 1911. The site became a resort, then a state park, offering areas for visitors to boat, camp, or picnic.

=== Guillemot Cove Nature Reserve ===
The 158-acre (64 ha) Kitsap County Guillemot Cove Nature Reserve is 6 miles (10 km) southwest of Seabeck and was the property of the Reynolds family from 1939 to 1993. The area is open to the public. Attractions include a hollowed-out stump of a red cedar, referred to as the Stump House.

== Notable residents ==
- Ashley Wagner (born 1991), figure skater
