= River lamprey =

River lamprey is a common name for several fishes and may refer to:

- European river lamprey, Lampetra fluviatilis, native to Europe
- Western river lamprey, Lampetra ayresii, native to western North America

== See also ==
- Brook lamprey, Lampetra planeri
- Lamprey River
