= Tee Harbor, Juneau =

Coordinates: 58°24′37″N 134°45′21″W

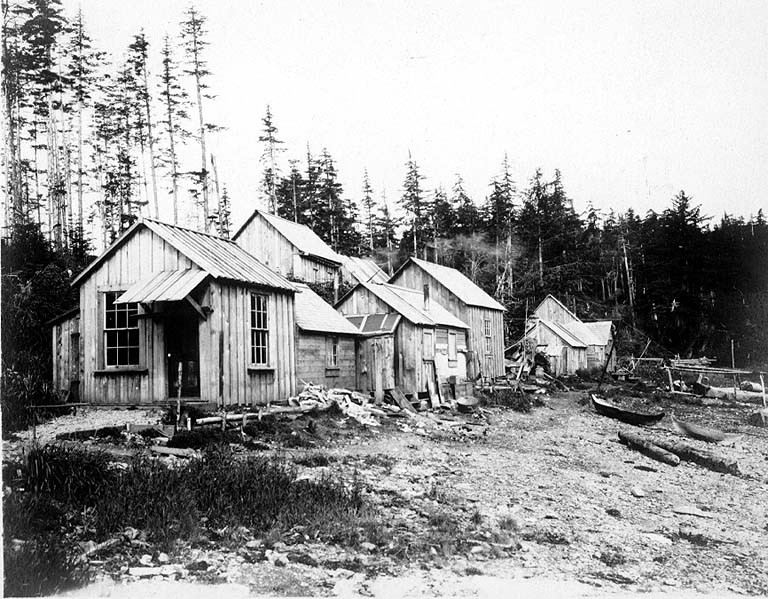
Tlingit houses and canoes in Tee Harbor, June 1907

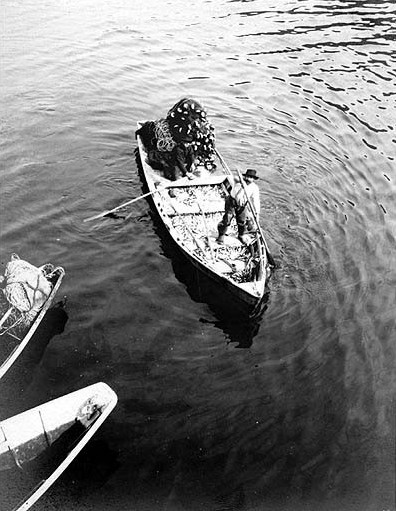
Gill netter with bait herring in Tee Harbor, June 1907

Tee Harbor (also known as The Harbor) refers to two adjacent populated places in the City and Borough of Juneau, Alaska. The area had a population of 32 in 1950. It is located 3 miles (4.8 km) northwest of Fairhaven and 17 miles (27 km) northwest of the main city of Juneau.

Business in the area began with a saltery in 1901 and a cannery in 1911; the cannery burnt down in 1912, according to a 1957 publication by R. N. DeArmond.

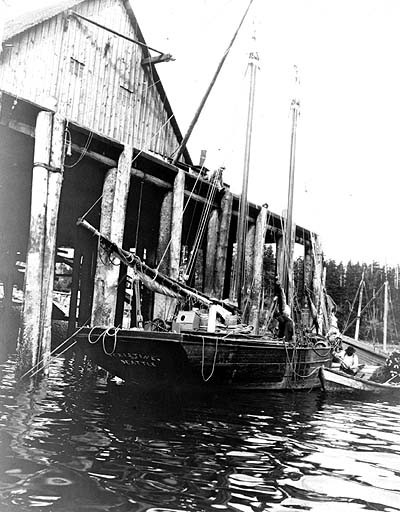
Halibut fishing schooner Christine at the Tee Harbor wharf, June 1907

The name was published in Polk's Gazetteer in 1916.

== Demographics ==
Historical population
Census	Pop.	Note	%±
1940	37		—
1950	32		−13.5%
U.S. Decennial Census

Tee Harbor first appeared on the 1940 and 1950 U.S. Census as an unincorporated village. It was later annexed into Juneau.

== See also ==
- Lena Beach, Alaska
