= Quilcene Historical Museum =

Coordinates: 47.8281°N 122.8758°W

The Quilcene Historical Museum, Quilcene, Washington, was established in 1991 and operates under non-profit status. The non-profit owns the museum, Worthington Park, and the Hamilton/Worthington House.

The Quilcene Historical Museum is administered by an all-volunteer Board of Directors. This group of dedicated individuals are responsible for running the museum, caring for the landscape on all ten acres of Worthington Park, maintaining all buildings, overseeing the Hamilton/Worthington house, orchestrating public events, communicating with the public and much more.

The museum has published books about the history of Quilcene, Washington, and Brinnon, Washington.

The Quilcene Historical Museum's major events during the year include Opening Day Weekend, school tours and special tours throughout the school year, and Quilcene Fiber Festival.
