= Keith Lazelle =

Keith Lazelle is a photographer based in Quilcene, Washington, United States. The Olympic Medical Center in Port Angeles owns the largest collection of his work. In 2008 the Burke Museum of Natural History and Culture featured an exhibit of his work titled "Fast Moving Water: The Hoh River Story" with a companion book, Fast Moving Water: Images and Essays from the Hoh River, published by the Hoh River Trust.

Photographs by Keith Lazelle have been used by Audubon, Eddie Bauer, Merrill Lynch, Microsoft, Outside magazine, Safeco Insurance, Seattle Space Needle, and The Nature Conservancy.
