= Kitsap Memorial State Park =

Public recreation area in Washington State

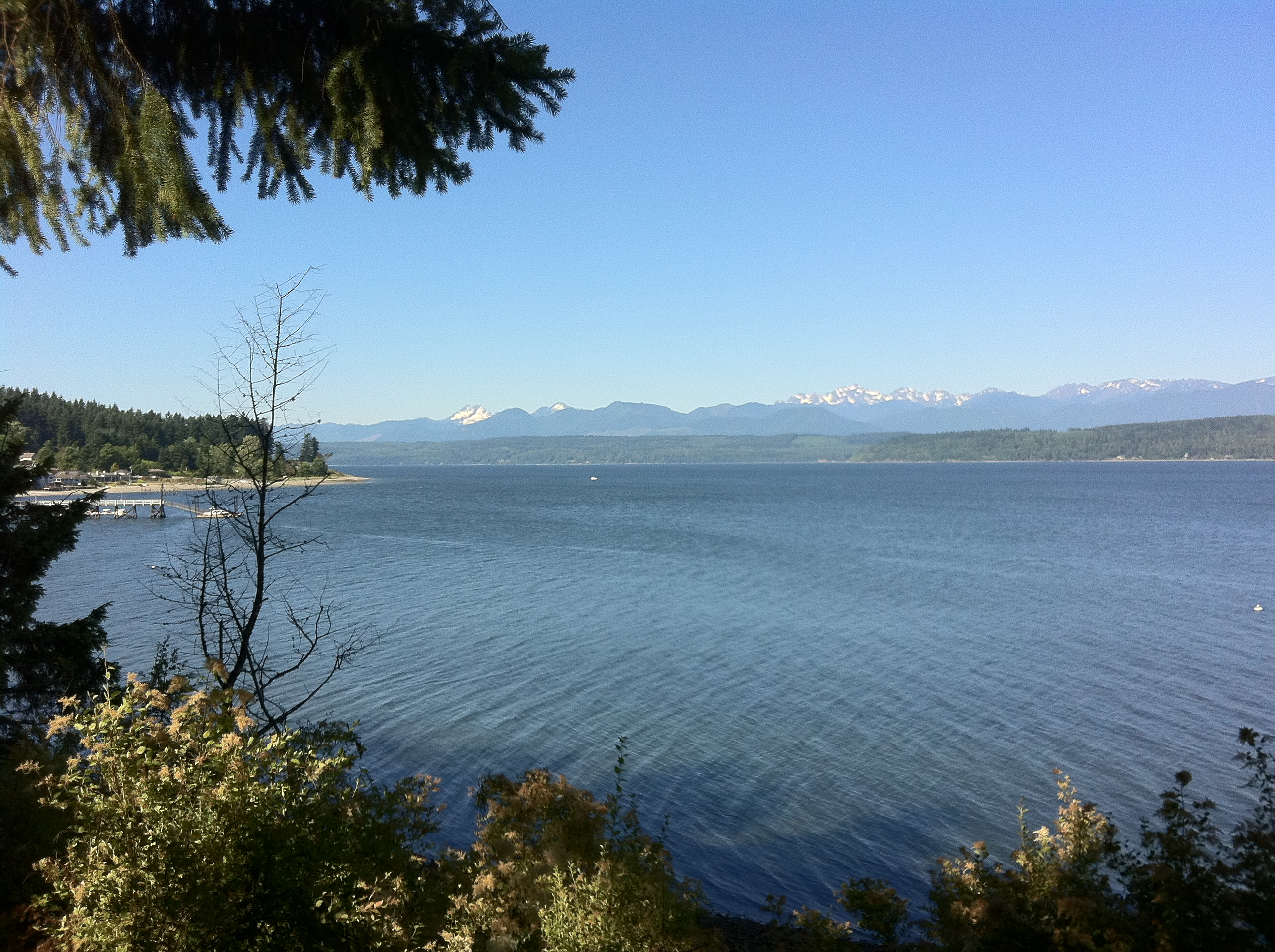

- Location within Washington (state) Location within the United States
- Location: Kitsap County, Washington, United States
- Coordinates: 47°49′04″N 122°38′58″W
- Area: 63 acres (25 ha)
- Elevation: 33 ft (10 m)
- Established: 1949
- Administrator: Washington State Parks and Recreation Commission
- Visitors: 359,859 (in 2024)
- Website: Official website

Kitsap Memorial State Park is a 63-acre (25 ha) public recreation area located in Lofall, Washington. The state park offers 1,797 feet (548 m) of shoreline on the Hood Canal and activities that include picnicking, camping, hiking, scuba diving, fishing, swimming, clamming, crabbing, beachcombing, birdwatching, and field sports.
