= Triton Cove State Park =

State park in Washington (state), United States

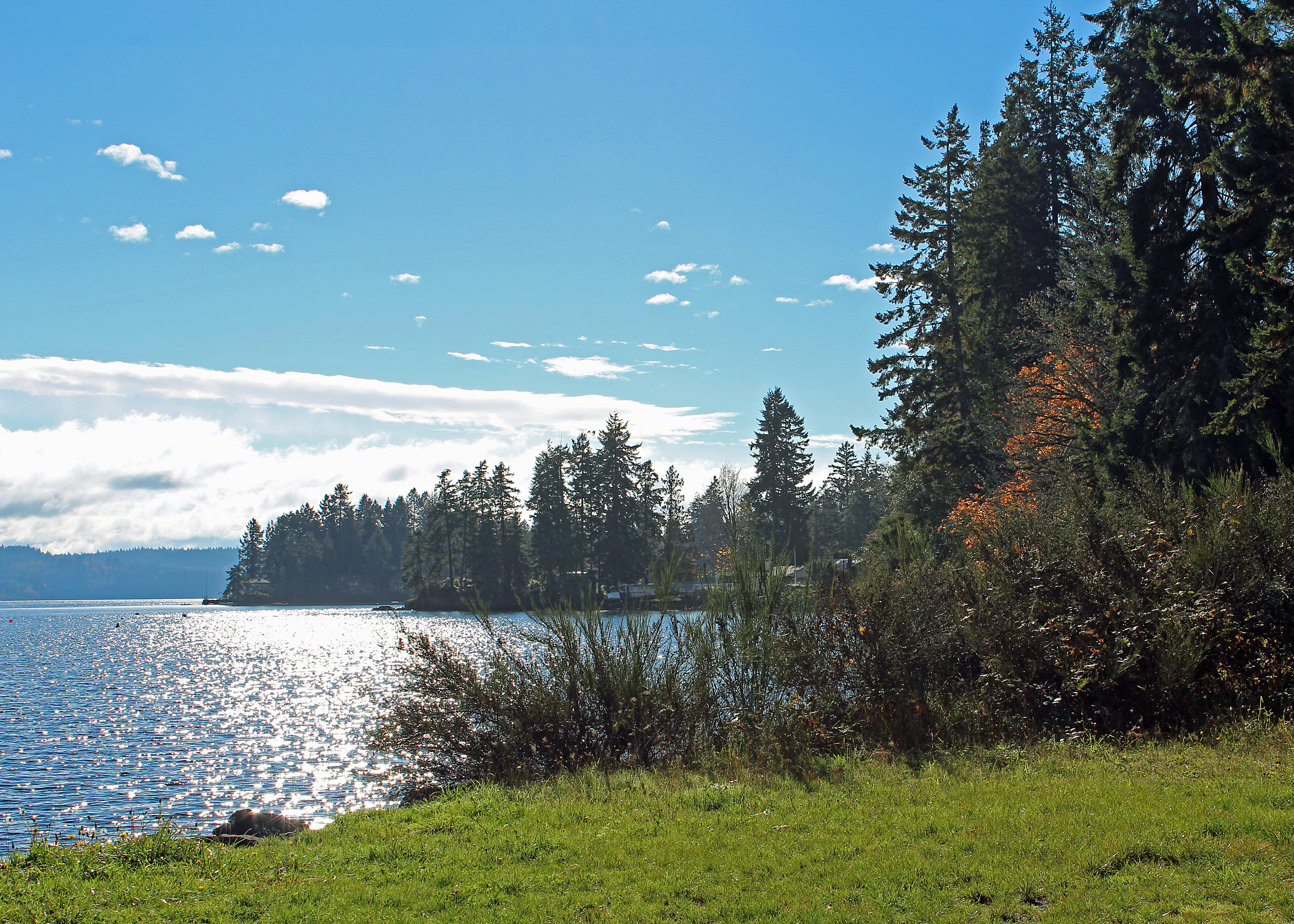
- Triton Cove State Park, October 2013

- Location within Washington (state) Location within the United States
- Location: Jefferson County, Washington, United States
- Coordinates: 47°36′22″N 122°59′10″W
- Area: 30 acres (12 ha)
- Established: 1990
- Administrator: Washington State Parks and Recreation Commission
- Website: Official website

Triton Cove State Park is a public recreation area covering 30 acres (12 ha) on Triton Cove at the southeastern corner of Jefferson County, Washington. The state park has 555 feet (169 m) of saltwater shoreline on Hood Canal with facilities for picnicking, docking, diving, fishing, crabbing, and shellfish harvesting.
