= Lena Beach, Juneau =

Coordinates: 58°23′35″N 134°44′50″W

Lena Beach is a populated place in Juneau, Alaska, United States. It is 14 miles (23 km) northwest of the city of Juneau.

== Demographics ==
Historical population
Census	Pop.	Note	%±
1940	23		—
1950	54		134.8%
1970	300		—
U.S. Decennial Census

Lena Beach first appeared on the 1940 & 1950 U.S. Census as an unincorporated village. In 1970 it was listed under Lena Cove. The same year, all places with Juneau Borough were consolidated into the city of Juneau.
