= Scenic Beach State Park =

State park in the U.S. state of Washington

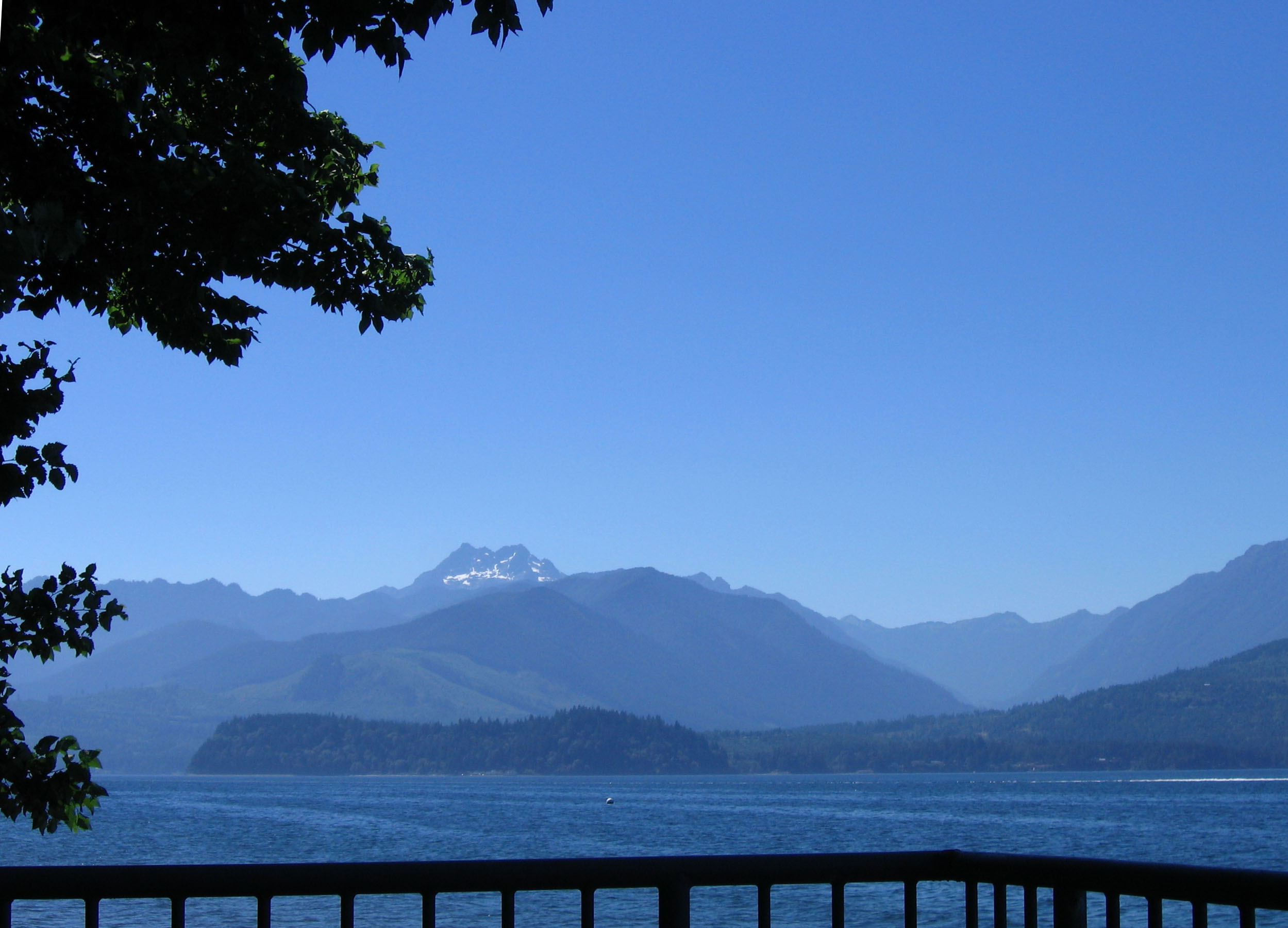

- Location within Washington (state) Location within the United States
- Location: Kitsap County, Washington, United States
- Coordinates: 47°38′57″N 122°50′44″W
- Area: 121 acres (49 ha)
- Elevation: 26 ft (7.9 m)
- Established: 1963; opened: 1975
- Administrator: Washington State Parks and Recreation Commission
- Visitors: 210,825 (in 2024)
- Website: Official website

Scenic Beach State Park is a public recreation area covering 121 acres (49 ha) along Hood Canal in Kitsap County, Washington. After the area's twenty-year career as an auto camp ended in 1959, the state purchased the site in 1963, opening it as state park in 1975. The park has 1,500 feet (460 m) of shoreline and activities that include picnicking, camping, boating, diving, fishing, and swimming.
