= Natural Resources Building =

- Interactive map of Building location

General information
- Location: 1111 Washington St. SE, Olympia, Washington
- Coordinates: 47°02′14″N 122°53′52″W
- Completed: 1992

Technical details
- Floor area: 328,000 square feet (30,500 m^{2})

Design and construction
- Architect: Fentress Architects

The Natural Resources Building is a government building in Olympia, Washington that provides offices for the state's Department of Natural Resources, Department of Fish & Wildlife, Department of Agriculture, Recreation and Conservation Office, and the Puget Sound Partnership.

The 777,000-square-foot (72,200 m^{2}) structure includes 328,000-square-foot (30,500 m^{2}) of office space and a 449,000-square-foot (41,700 m^{2}) parking garage for 1,360 vehicles. The building includes a full-service cafeteria that is open to the public.

The Natural Resources Building received an award from the Architecture and Energy Building Excellence in the Northwest Awards Program.
