= Washington Department of Fish and Wildlife =

Washington state governmental department

- Logo of the Washington Department of Fish and Wildlife

Agency overview
- Formed: 1994
- Preceding agencies: Washington Department of Fisheries; Washington Department of Wildlife
- Jurisdiction: State of Washington
- Headquarters: Natural Resources Building, Olympia, Washington, U.S.; 47°02′14″N 122°53′52″W
- Employees: approx. 2,250 (2024)
- Annual budget: $723.8 million (2023-25)
- Agency executive: Kelly Susewind, director
- Key document: Fish and Wildlife Enforcement Code
- Website: wdfw.wa.gov

The Washington Department of Fish and Wildlife (WDFW) is a department of the government of the state of Washington, established in 1994.

The WDFW manages over a million acres of land, the bulk of which is generally open to the public, and 475 water access sites. Many of the sites are termed "wildlife areas" and permit hunting during the hunting season, typically in the autumn and early winter for birds, but all year round for coyotes. Due to declining participation, the department has a hunter and angler recruitment, retention and reactivation plan. A Discover Pass is required to park in the wildlife areas.

WDFW is headquartered in Olympia, Washington and has 6 regional offices in Washington. In 2024, the agency collected approximately $59 million and $6.6 million from the sales of recreational and commercial licenses, respectively.

== History ==
The department's history starts with the appointment of a fisheries commissioner in 1890 by Governor of Washington Elisha P. Ferry. The department is overseen by a director appointed by the Washington Fish and Wildlife Commission; Kelly Susewind was appointed to the position in June 2018. Hunting and fishing license sales and income from the Discover Pass recreational access fee make up about one-quarter of the department’s budget.

== See also ==
- Bern Shanks
- Tarboo Unit
