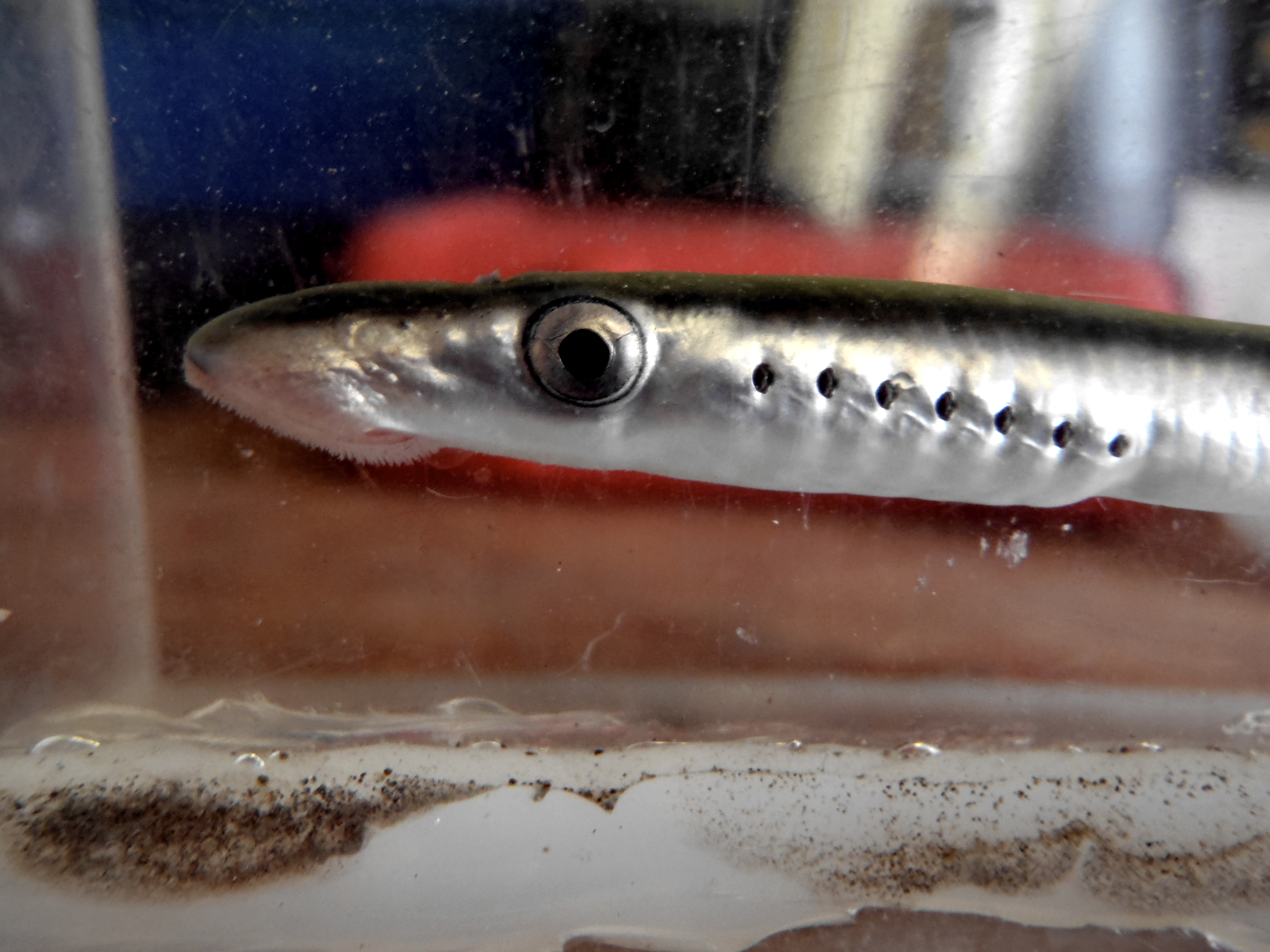

Conservation status
- Least Concern (IUCN 3.1)

Scientific classification
- Kingdom: Animalia
- Phylum: Chordata
- Infraphylum: Agnatha
- Class: Petromyzontida
- Order: Petromyzontiformes
- Family: Petromyzontidae
- Genus: Lampetra
- Species: L. ayresii

Binomial name
- Lampetra ayresii (Günther, 1870)

Synonyms
- Petromyzon ayresii Günther 1870; Petromyzon plumbeus Ayres 1855; Ammocoetes cibarius Girard 1858; Lampetra cibaria (Girard 1858)

= Lampetra ayresii =

Species of jawless fish

Lampetra ayresii is a species of lamprey in the family Petromyzontidae. It is also called the river lamprey or western river lamprey. It is found in the eastern Pacific, specifically from Tee Harbor, Juneau in Alaska to the Sacramento–San Joaquin drainage in California, USA. It can survive in both marine surface waters and freshwater lakes, rivers, and creeks. In freshwater, it is found typically in the lower portions of large river systems. It is a predatory fish and feeds on fishes in the size range of 10–30 cm. It feeds by attaching to prey using its round, sucker-like mouth. Adult western river lampreys typically grow to about 21 cm (8.3 in) total length (TL), but can reach 31 cm (12 in) TL.

== Description ==
Adult western river lampreys are noted by their long body, round mouth, and lack of jaws. The mouths of lamprey are characterized by radiating rows of disc teeth.

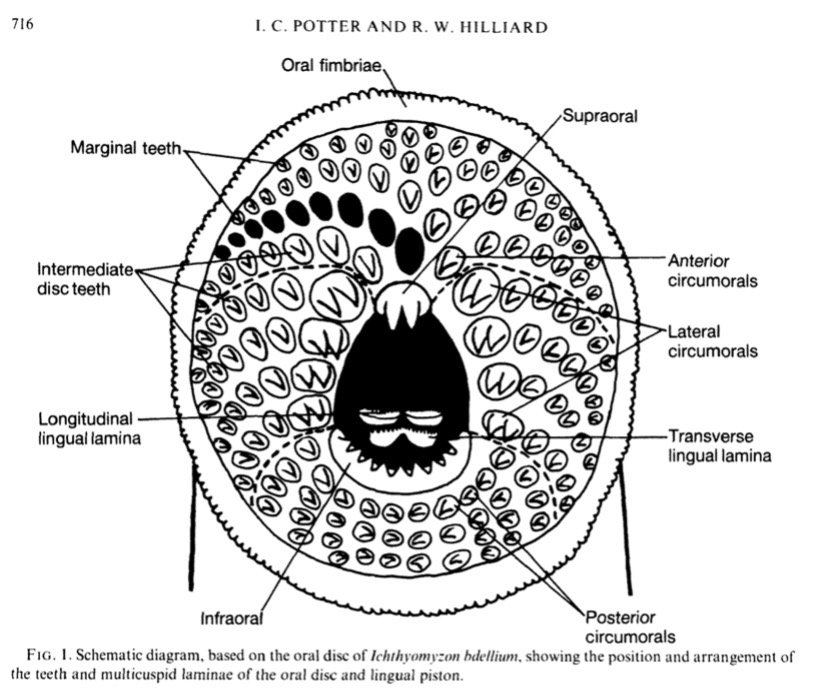
Systematic Diagram of Lamprey Oral Disc

The mouth of the Lampetra genus is characterized by gaps in the bi and tricuspid lateral circumorals, missing posterior circumorals, crescent shaped infraoral lamina, tall but small longitudinal lingual lamina, curved transverse lingual lamina, and deep supraoral lamina (Diagrams of oral anatomy below). This structure helps facilitate the more predatory feeding style of the river lamprey (more below in the Diet section).

They have no scales, and are typically dark brown in on their back, sides, and tail with yellow bellies and silver around the head, gill openings and lower sides. Characteristic of lamprey, they lack pectoral, pelvic, and anal fins. Ammocetes are lightly pigmented with a pale head and tail. Immature adults can be characterized by their silver coloration and sharp teeth. As they mature, their two dorsal fins eventually connect.

Oral Disc Anatomy

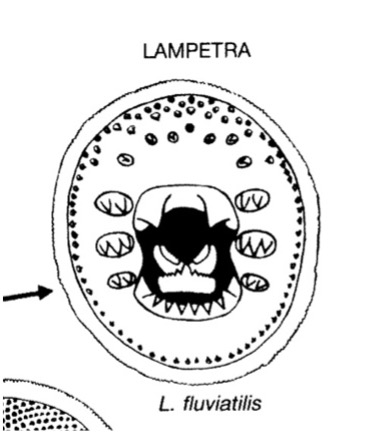
Diagram of teeth and multicuspid laminae of Lampetra fluviatilis

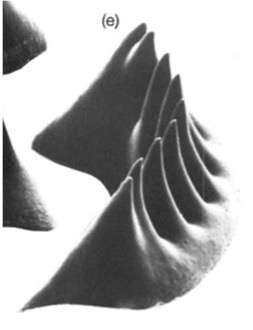
Crescentic infraoral lamina of Lampetra fluviatilis

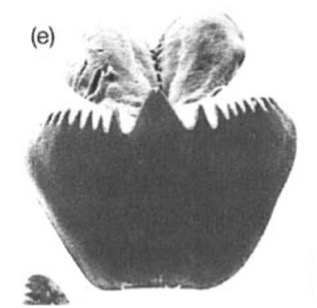
Anterior view of transverse and paired longitudinal lingual laminae of Lampetra fluviatilis

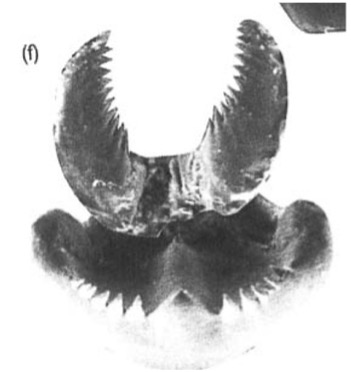
Dorsal view of transverse and paired longitudinal lingual laminae of Lampetra fluviatilis

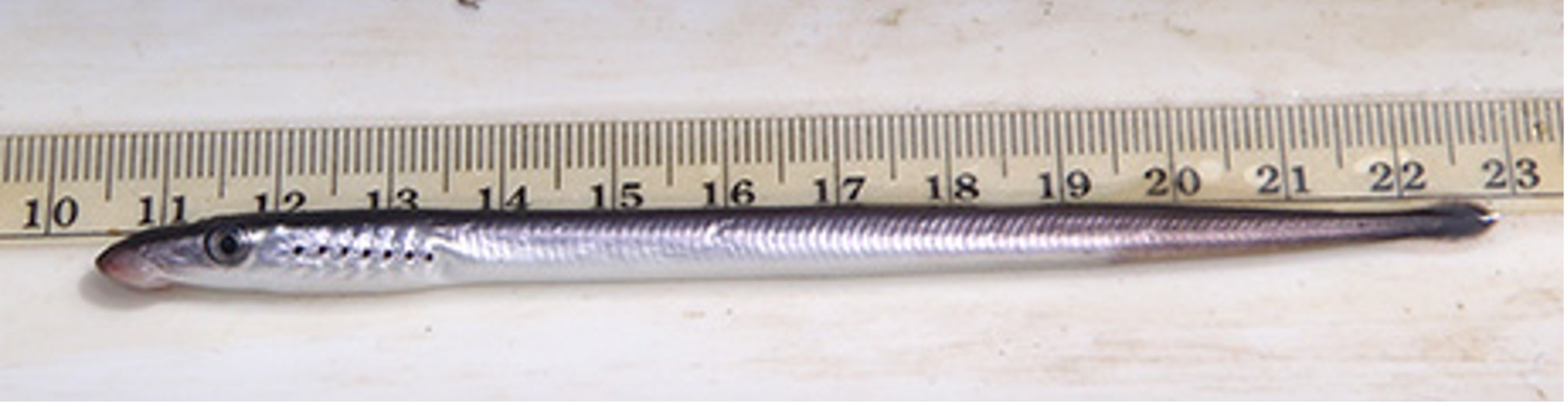
Adult Western River Lamprey

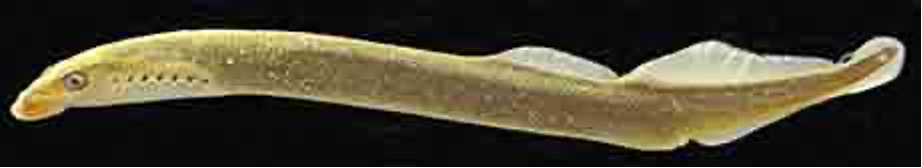
Adult Western Brooke Lamprey

The river lamprey is considered one of four species in the Lampetra genus found in the western United States. Other species include Lampetra richardsoni (Western brook lamprey), Lampetra hubbsi (Kern brook Lamprey), and Lampetra pacifica (Pacific brook lamprey). The western brook lamprey shares a similar range to the river lamprey and can be difficult to distinguish during metamorphosis due to similar dentition. Western brook lamprey differs from river lamprey in that they do not migrate after metamorphosis and have reduced dentition. Research that examined the pancreas to distinguish lamprey species found differences in their pancreatic tissue, however the authors noted this could be due to genetic variation. The western brook lamprey and river lamprey have been considered a clade separate from the other western U.S. lamprey species. However, more recent genetic research suggests the western brook lamprey would be better categorized as a member of a Lampetra ayresii species complex. Additional research that crossbred river lamprey and western brook lamprey found that size ratio between males and females had a more significant impact on spawning success than species. This suggests that differences in life history that results in different sizes causes reproductive isolation.

== Diet ==
The river lamprey begins as a filter feeder in its ammocoete stage. During this time, they feed on algae and detritus. Predatory feeding begins in the adult stage and once it has reached 16.2 cm. During this time river lamprey primarily feed on muscle tissue of American shad, Chinook salmon, Shiner perch, and Pacific herring. Attachment sites on prey are found primarily on the sides, with a slight preference to the anterior (front) side above the lateral line. Most wounds caused by the lamprey are severe and result in the death of the prey.

The large wound size present on prey can be explained by the river lampreys feeding style. Instead of feeding on blood like parasitic lamprey, the river lamprey feeds on flesh and underlying tissue, which requires shifting the location of the attachment site. The reduced number of teeth allows this species to easily detach and reposition on their prey. Additionally, the shape of the transverse lingual laminae helps this fish gouge into its prey.

== Life history ==
Western River Lampreys live on average for 3–4 years, spending most of their life in freshwaters and only living in marine waters for about 10 weeks. Starting their lives as an ammocoete (larva), they burrow into the stream bottom and survive as filter feeders. This relatively sedentary life stage can last up to 3 years. During this period, ammocoetes are vulnerable from predation from birds and fishes. Following their ammocoete stage, river lamprey begin metamorphosis to a temporary macrophthalmia stage. This metamorphosis starts in the months of July–April and can take up to 9–10 months. During this stage, mouth parts and adult structures are developed.

After metamorphosis, they enter the ocean as adults between the months of May and July. They spend a parasitic feeding phase here for 10 weeks, during which they grow rapidly and reach their maximum size. While in marine environments, adults are preyed on by fish and aquatic mammals.

After their feeding phase, they migrate back to fresh waters to spawning areas. They likely prefer spawning areas upstream and with gravel bottoms. Both sexes will move around stones to construct the nests. Each female will then lay around 11,400 to 37,300 eggs. Adults die after the eggs are laid and fertilized.

== Distribution ==
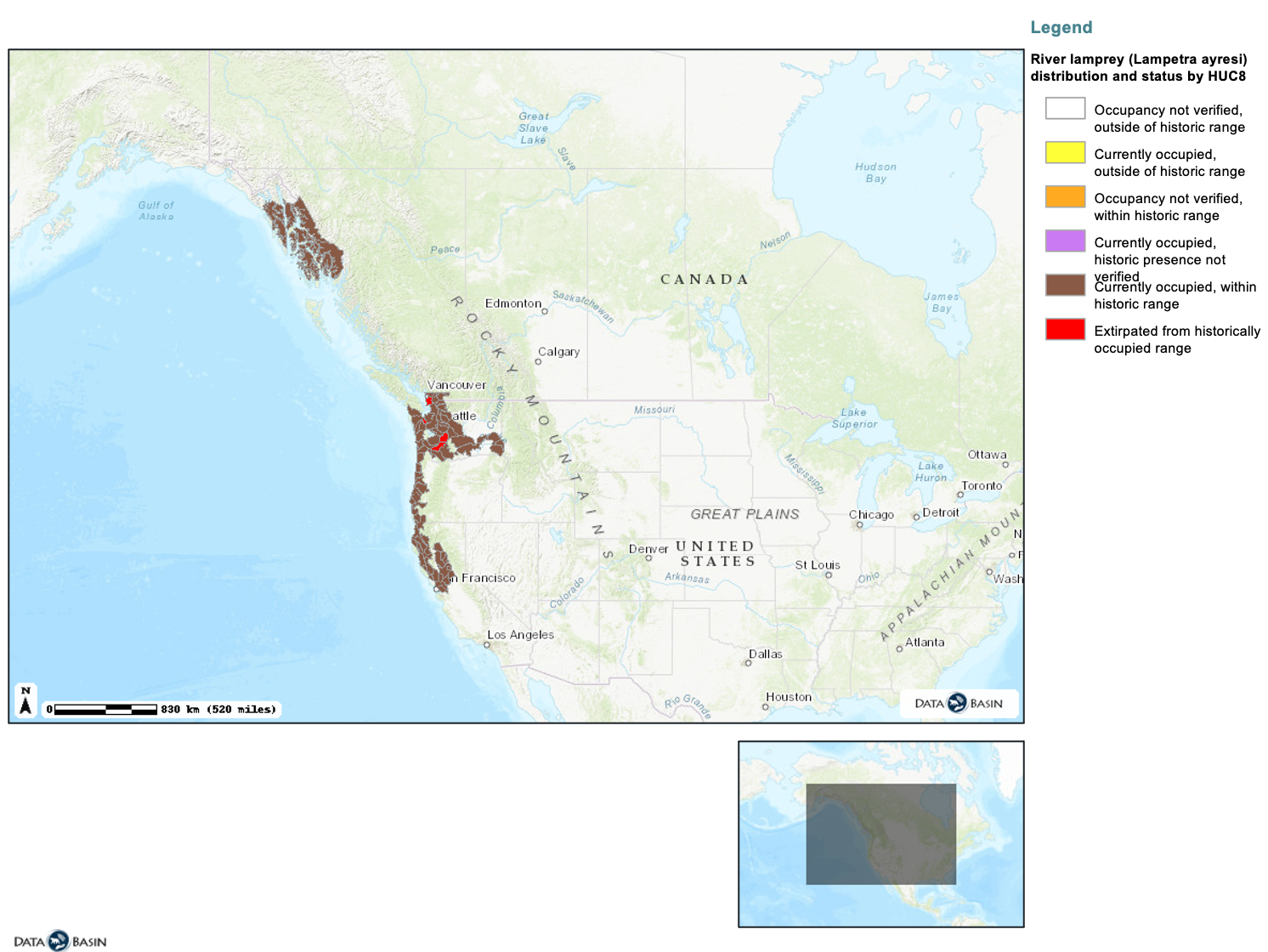
Distribution of River Lamprey (Data Basin)

During their freshwater stages, river lamprey can be found in the main tributaries between the San Francisco Bay and Juneau, Alaska. Western river lamprey have been found in Skidegate Lake, the Sacramento-San Joaquin Delta, and the Skeena, Fraser, Yaquina, and Columbia Rivers.

During the summer, adult river lamprey migrate to the ocean for feeding. During this time, this species can be found as south as Trinidad Head, California up to Vancouver Island. Feeding occurs on average 21km from shore in the upper water column (30 m from the surface).

== Conservation ==
The western river lamprey currently is not currently listed as threatened or endangered; however habitat degradation and stream regulation do threaten the stability of this species. The many dams along rivers such as the Sacramento and San Joaquin rivers can be a barrier for migrating lamprey. While many of these dams do have screening methods to capture and release migrating fish, many of these systems are designed primarily for salmonoids. Dams also degrade the quality of surrounding habitat, overall reducing habitat availability for this species.
