= Quilcene, Washington =

- Census-designated place
- Nickname: "Pearl of the Peninsula"
- Location of Quilcene, Washington
- Coordinates: 47°45′35″N 122°53′07″W
- Country: United States
- State: Washington
- County: Jefferson

Area
  - Total: 9.2 sq mi (23.8 km^{2})
  - Land: 8.8 sq mi (22.8 km^{2})
  - Water: 0.39 sq mi (1.0 km^{2})
- Elevation: 427 ft (130 m)

Population (2020)
  - Total: 598
  - Density: 67.9/sq mi (26.2/km^{2})
- Time zone: UTC-8 (Pacific (PST))
  - Summer (DST): UTC-7 (PDT)
- ZIP Code: 98376
- Area code(s): 360, 564
- FIPS code: 53-56975
- GNIS feature ID: 2409117

Quilcene is an unincorporated community and census-designated place (CDP) in Jefferson County, Washington, United States. The population was 598 at the 2020 census.

The community is located on the Olympic Peninsula at the head of Quilcene Bay, an arm of the seawater-filled glacial valley of Hood Canal. Each year many visitors enjoy the panoramic views of Mount Rainier, Puget Sound and Seattle from the 2,804-foot (855 m) summit of nearby Mount Walker, the only peak facing Puget Sound that has a road to its summit. The Olympic National Forest lands in Quilcene hold Douglas fir, spring-blooming Pacific rhododendrons, Oregon grape, and salal. Leland Lake is located north of Quilcene.

Quilcene oysters are named after the community. Quilcene has one of the largest oyster hatcheries in the world.

== History ==
Early inhabitants of the area were the Twana people, inhabiting the length of Hood Canal, and rarely invading other tribes. The name "Quilcene" comes from the Twana word /qʷəʔlsíd/, referring to a tribal group and the name of an aboriginal Twana village and community on Quilcene Bay. The Quilcene ("salt-water people") were a distinct band of these people.

The Wilkes Expedition charted the place as "Kwil-sid" in 1841. Hampden Cottle, a logger from Maine, and several other families settled there in 1860 and eventually established a town. The town was originally situated on the banks of the Quilcene River, before being moved to higher ground. The economy in Quilcene was based primarily on farming and logging, and by 1880 the town had a population of 53.

The Tubal Cain Mining Company in 1902 claimed that Quilcene would become the center for the smelting of iron, copper, gold, and manganese that was expected to be found in the Olympic Mountains; however, little ore was ever discovered.

Circa 1910, Green's Shingle Mill was a large part of Quilcene's history.

== Geography ==
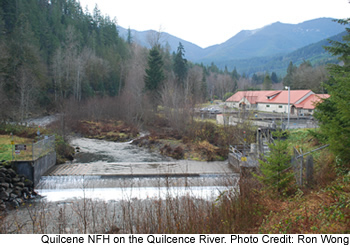
USFWS Quilcene National Fish Hatchery

Quilcene is located in eastern Jefferson County at the north end of Quilcene Bay, an arm of Dabob Bay, which extends north from Hood Canal. The Big Quilcene River forms the southern edge of the community, and the Little Quilcene River forms the northeastern edge; both arise in the Olympic Mountains to the west and flow past the town into Quilcene Bay.

According to the United States Census Bureau, the CDP has a total area of 9.2 square miles (23.8 km^{2}), of which 8.8 square miles (22.8 km^{2}) are land and 0.4 square miles (1.0 km^{2}), or 4.25%, are water.

The Olympic National Forest is west and south of the community. The 2,804-foot (855 m) summit of Mount Walker, 2 miles (3 km) southwest of the CDP, offers views of Mount Jupiter, Buckhorn Mountain, Mount Constance, Mount Baker and the town of Quilcene.

At the southwest edge of the Quilcene CDP, at the union of the Big Quilcene River and Penny Creek, the Quilcene National Fish Hatchery has been operating since 1911. There, the United States Fish and Wildlife Service raises coho salmon for on-station release and provides coho salmon eggs and fingerlings for tribal programs.

=== Climate ===
Quilcene experiences an oceanic climate (Köppen climate classification Cfb) and is almost categorised as part of the Csb climate category, receiving slightly more than 30 mm (1.2 in), the threshold for Cfb inclusion.

Climate data for Quilcene
Month	Jan	Feb	Mar	Apr	May	Jun	Jul	Aug	Sep	Oct	Nov	Dec	Year
Record high °F (°C)	64 (18)	71 (22)	78 (26)	84 (29)	91 (33)	96 (36)	100 (38)	98 (37)	99 (37)	83 (28)	74 (23)	65 (18)	100 (38)
Mean daily maximum °F (°C)	45 (7)	50 (10)	56 (13)	61 (16)	67 (19)	72 (22)	77 (25)	79 (26)	73 (23)	62 (17)	51 (11)	44 (7)	61 (16)
Mean daily minimum °F (°C)	31 (−1)	33 (1)	35 (2)	38 (3)	43 (6)	48 (9)	51 (11)	50 (10)	46 (8)	40 (4)	35 (2)	31 (−1)	40 (5)
Record low °F (°C)	3 (−16)	5 (−15)	12 (−11)	27 (−3)	27 (−3)	34 (1)	35 (2)	38 (3)	29 (−2)	22 (−6)	5 (−15)	4 (−16)	3 (−16)
Average precipitation inches (mm)	7.39 (188)	7.38 (187)	5.93 (151)	3.81 (97)	2.82 (72)	2.13 (54)	1.29 (33)	1.24 (31)	1.60 (41)	4.13 (105)	7.99 (203)	8.65 (220)	54.36 (1,382)

== Demographics ==
Historical population
Census	Pop.	Note	%±
2000	591		—
2010	596		0.8%
2020	598		0.3%
U.S. Decennial Census; 1990 2000 2010

Quilcene first appeared as a census designated place in the 2000 U.S. census.

=== Racial and ethnic composition ===
Quilcene CDP, Washington – Racial and ethnic composition Note: the US Census treats Hispanic/Latino as an ethnic category. This table excludes Latinos from the racial categories and assigns them to a separate category. Hispanics/Latinos may be of any race.
Race / Ethnicity (NH = Non-Hispanic)	Pop 2000	Pop 2010	Pop 2020	% 2000	% 2010	% 2020
White alone (NH)	497	525	530	84.09%	88.09%	88.63%
Black or African American alone (NH)	7	0	2	1.18%	0.00%	0.33%
Native American or Alaska Native alone (NH)	20	13	8	3.38%	2.18%	1.34%
Asian alone (NH)	2	9	6	0.34%	1.51%	1.00%
Native Hawaiian or Pacific Islander alone (NH)	1	1	0	0.17%	0.17%	0.00%
Other race alone (NH)	5	0	11	0.85%	0.00%	1.84%
Mixed race or Multiracial (NH)	51	24	29	8.63%	4.03%	4.85%
Hispanic or Latino (any race)	8	24	12	1.35%	4.03%	2.01%
Total	591	596	598	100.00%	100.00%	100.00%

=== 2010 census ===
As of the 2010 census, 596 people lived in 312 households in the CDP, representing a population increase of 6 and a household increase of 69 over the 2000 census). With 123 children under the age of 18, 20.6% are school age or younger.

In 2000, the population density was 60.6 people per square mile (23.4/km^{2}). There were 284 housing units at an average density of 29.1/sq mi (11.2/km^{2}). The racial makeup of the CDP was 84.77% White, 1.18% African American, 3.55% Native American, 0.34% Asian, 0.17% Pacific Islander, 0.85% from other races, and 9.14% from two or more races. Hispanic or Latino of any race were 1.35% of the population.

In 2000, there were 243 households, out of which 27.6% had children under the age of 18 living with them, 51.9% were married couples living together, 7.8% had a female householder with no husband present, and 35.8% were non-families. 28.8% of all households were made up of individuals, and 8.2% had someone living alone who was 65 years of age or older. The average household size was 2.42 and the average family size was 2.95.

In 2000, the median income for a household in the CDP was $40,385, and the median income for a family was $45,313. Males had a median income of $36,500 versus $24,063 for females. The per capita income for the CDP was $17,335. About 11.3% of families and 15.2% of the population were below the poverty line, including 20.0% of those under age 18 and none of those age 65 or over.

== Culture ==
The Olympic Music Festival, based in Quilcene for 32 years until 2016, is a casual classical music event featuring world-renowned musicians that was held at a turn-of-the-century dairy farm on 55 acres (220,000 m^{2}) of farmland. The Olympic Music Festival was voted "Best Classical Music Festival" by readers of the Seattle Weekly. The music festival was founded in 1984 by Alan Iglitzin, originally intending it to be a summer home for the Philadelphia String Quartet. The festival moved to nearby Fort Worden in 2016.

== Notable people ==
- Keith Lazelle, American photographer

== See also ==
- Quilcene Historical Museum
- Tarboo Unit

== Further_reading ==
- Colfer, A. Michael; Colfer, Carol J. Pierce. (May 1979) Life and Learning in an American Town: Quilcene, Washington. Abt Associates, Inc., Cambridge, MA., 311 pp. Quilcene, Washington at the Internet Archive
