= Little Quilcene River =

- Location of the mouth of the Little Quilcene River in Washington Little Quilcene River (the United States)

Location
- Country: United States
- State: Washington
- County: Jefferson, Clallam

Physical characteristics
- Source: Olympic Mountains
  - coordinates: 47°52′31″N 123°2′51″W
- Mouth: Hood Canal
  - coordinates: 47°49′32″N 122°51′37″W

The Little Quilcene River is a river on the Olympic Peninsula in the U.S. state of Washington. It rises in Clallam County, near Mount Townsend of the Olympic Mountains.

== Etymology ==
The name "Quilcene" comes from the Twana word /qʷəʔlsíd/, referring to a tribal group and the name of an aboriginal Twana village and community on Quilcene Bay.

== Course ==
The river flows generally east through the Olympic National Forest. After exiting the higher mountains and the national forest the Little Quilcene River flows east and southeast through rolling terrain. It enters Jefferson County and flows more directly south to Quilcene, where it empties into the northern end of Quilcene Bay, part of Hood Canal.

The Big Quilcene River enters Quilcene Bay less than 1 mile (1.6 km) to the south.

== See also ==
- Big Quilcene River
- List of rivers of Washington (state)
- Quilcene, Washington
