= Big Quilcene River =

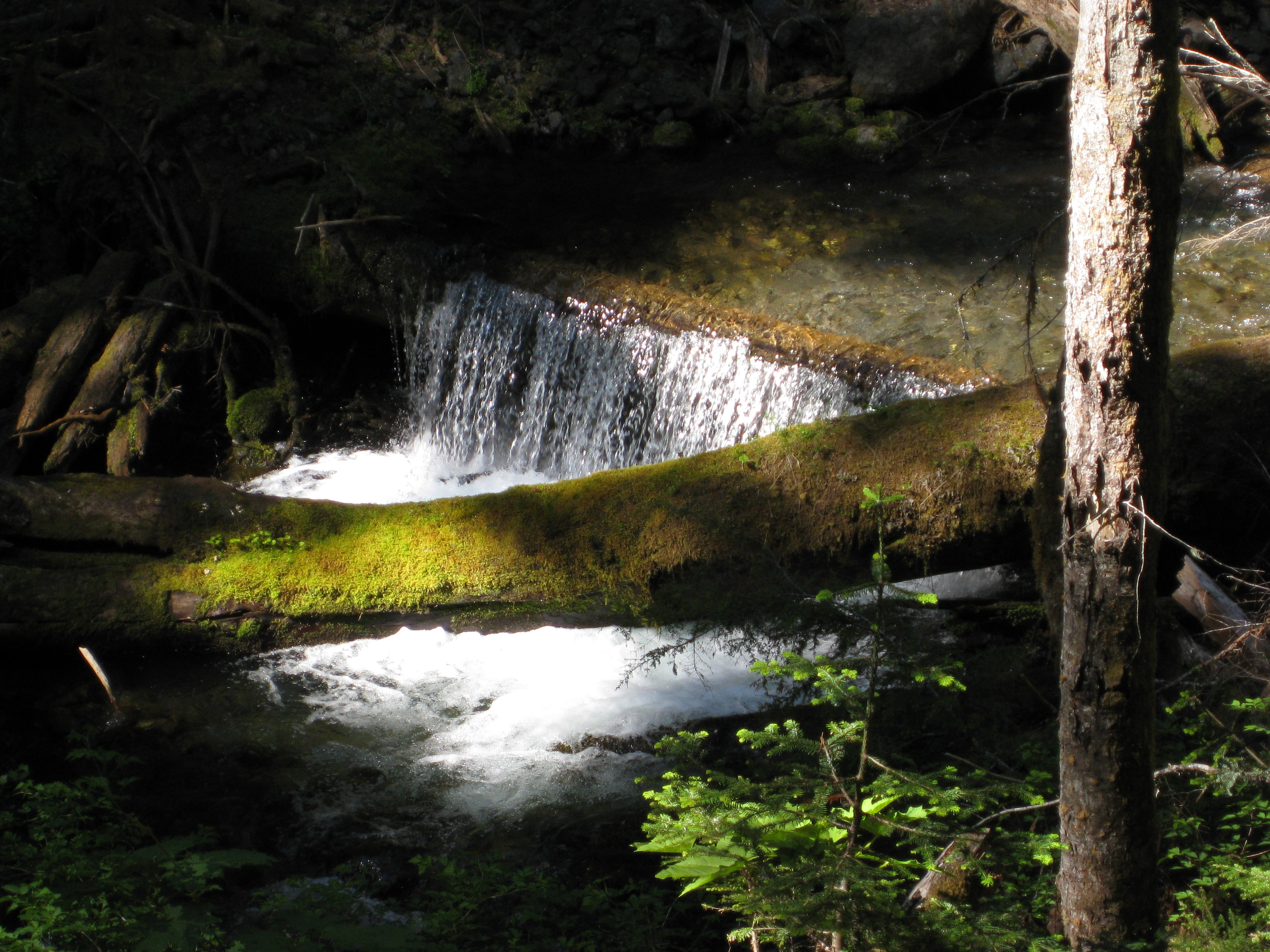
- Big Quilcene River

- Location of the mouth of the Big Quilcene River in Washington Big Quilcene River (the United States)

Location
- Country: United States
- State: Washington
- County: Jefferson

Physical characteristics
- Source: Olympic Mountains
  - coordinates: 47°48′52″N 123°7′9″W
- Mouth: Hood Canal
  - coordinates: 47°49′7″N 122°51′46″W

The Big Quilcene River is a river on the Olympic Peninsula in the U.S. state of Washington.

== Etymology ==
The name "Quilcene" comes from the Twana word /qʷəʔlsíd/, referring to a tribal group and the name of an aboriginal Twana village and community on Quilcene Bay.

== Course ==
The Big Quilcene River rises in the Buckhorn Wilderness near Marmot Pass, south of Buckhorn Mountain, and near Boulder Ridge. It flows generally east through the Olympic Mountains and the Olympic National Forest. After flowing south briefly the river is joined by Tunnel Creek and again flows east. It cuts through the Quilcene Range of the Olympic Mountains in which it collects a number of tributaries, including Mile And A Half Creek. Near Rainbow Campground the river turns north and is paralleled by U.S. Route 101. In its last few miles the river turns east and flows by the south side of Quilcene before emptying into Quilcene Bay, part of Hood Canal.

The Little Quilcene River enters Quilcene Bay less than 1 mile (1.6 km) to the north.

== See also ==
- List of Washington rivers
- Little Quilcene River
- Quilcene, Washington
