= Hood Canal =

Fjord in Washington state, United States

Coordinates: 47.8°N 122.7°W

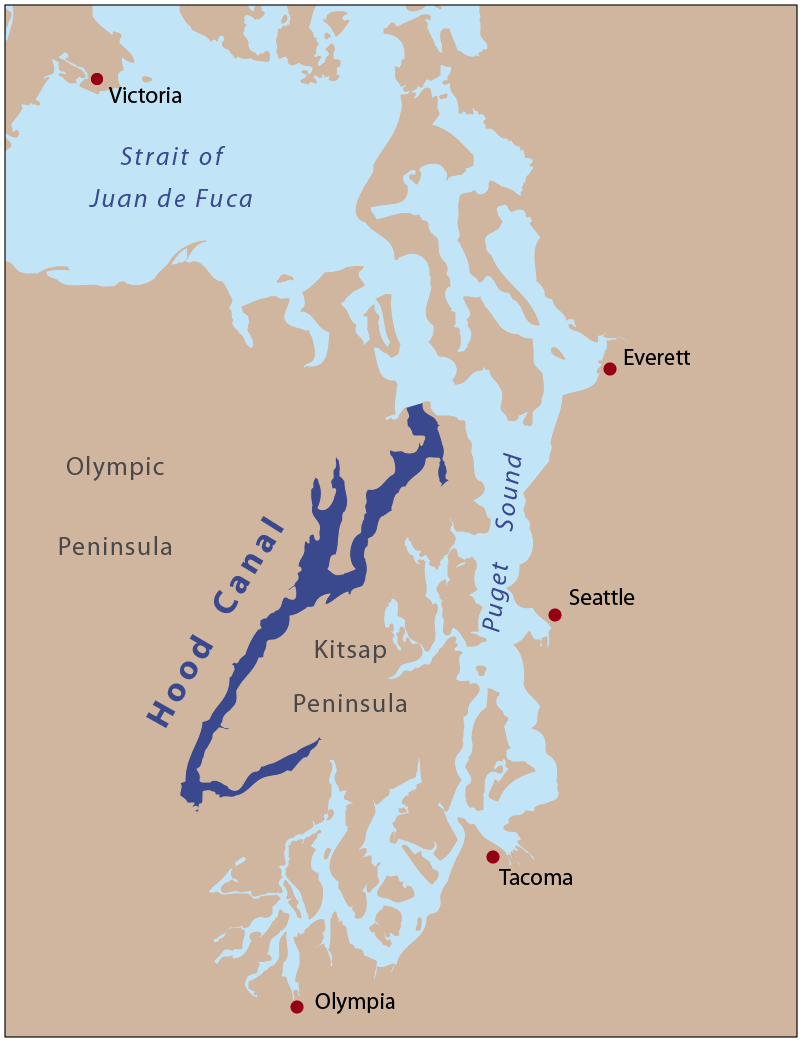
Hood Canal separates the Kitsap Peninsula and the Olympic Peninsula.

Hood Canal is a fjord-like body of water that lies south of Admiralty Inlet in Washington State that some consider to be the western lobe and one of the five main basins of Puget Sound. It is one of the minor bodies of water that constitute the Salish Sea. Maximum depth is 600 ft. Hood Canal is not a canal in the sense of an artificial waterway—it is a natural feature.

== Geography ==
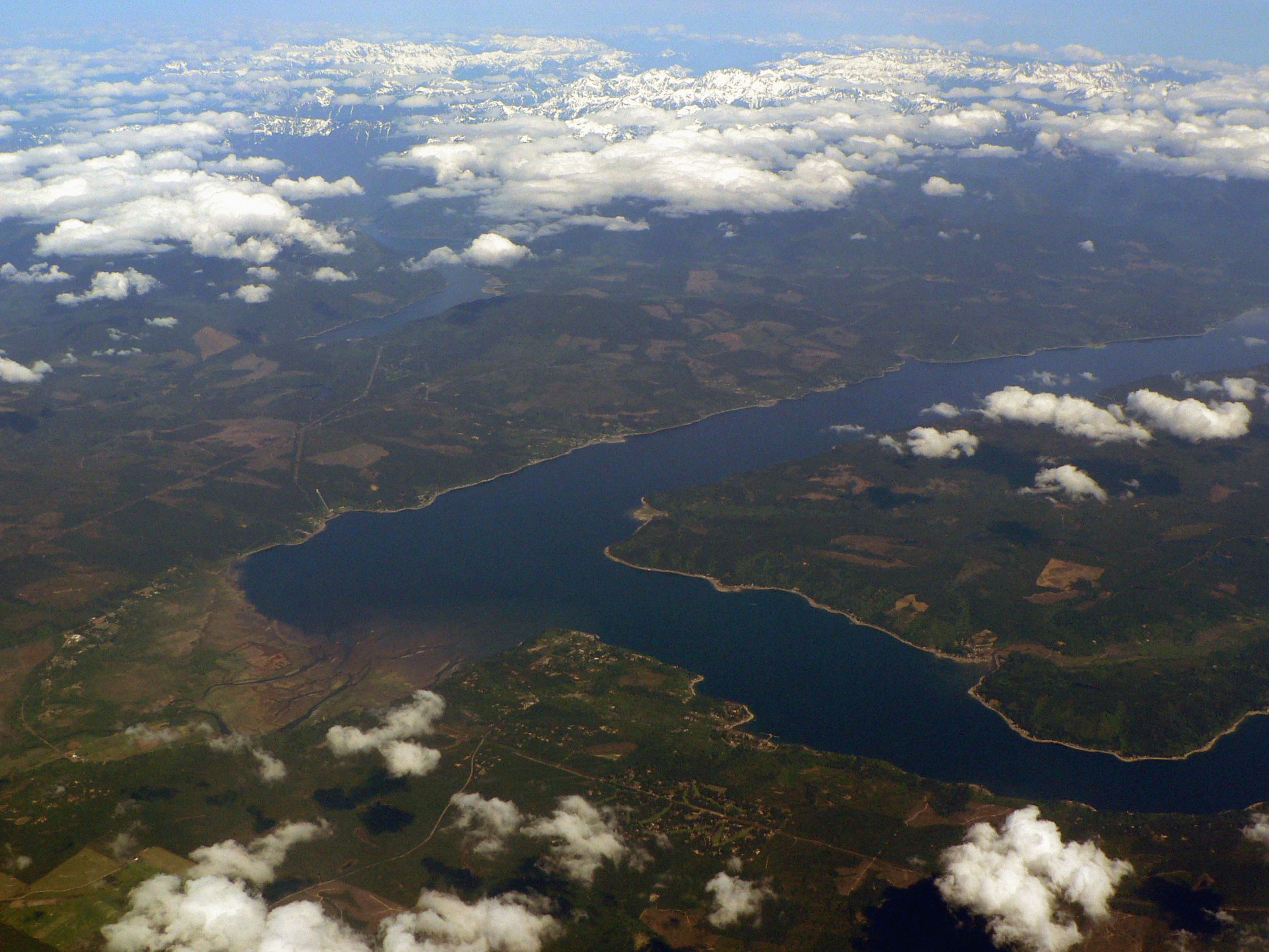
Great Bend of Hood Canal from the southeast

Hood Canal is long and narrow with an average width of 1.5 miles (2.4 km) and a mean depth of 53.8 metres (177 ft). It has 342.6 kilometres (212.9 mi) of shoreline and 42.4 square kilometres (16.4 sq mi) of tideland. Its surface area is 385.6 square kilometres (148.9 sq mi) and it contains a volume of water totaling 21 cubic kilometres (17,000,000 acre⋅ft). Hood Canal extends for about 50 miles (80 km) southwest from the entrance between Foulweather Bluff and Tala Point to Union, where it turns sharply to the northeast, a stretch called The Great Bend. It continues for about 15 miles (24 km) to Belfair, where it ends in a shallow tideland called Lynch Cove.

Along its entire length, Hood Canal separates the Kitsap Peninsula from the Olympic Peninsula of Washington. The U.S. Navy's Naval Base Kitsap, Bangor Annex, is located on the eastern shore of Hood Canal near the town of Silverdale. Hood Canal has several internal bays, the largest of which is Dabob Bay. Most of Dabob Bay is a Naval Restricted Area, and is used by the submarines stationed at the Bangor Base. Quilcene Bay is an inlet extending northwest from Dabob Bay. Near the north end of Hood Canal is Port Gamble, a bay and a town of the same name.

Several rivers flow into Hood Canal, mostly from the Olympic Peninsula, including the Skokomish River, Hamma Hamma River, Duckabush River, Dosewallips River, and Big Quilcene River. Small rivers emptying into Hood Canal from the Kitsap Peninsula include the Union River, Tahuya River, and Dewatto River.

== Geology ==
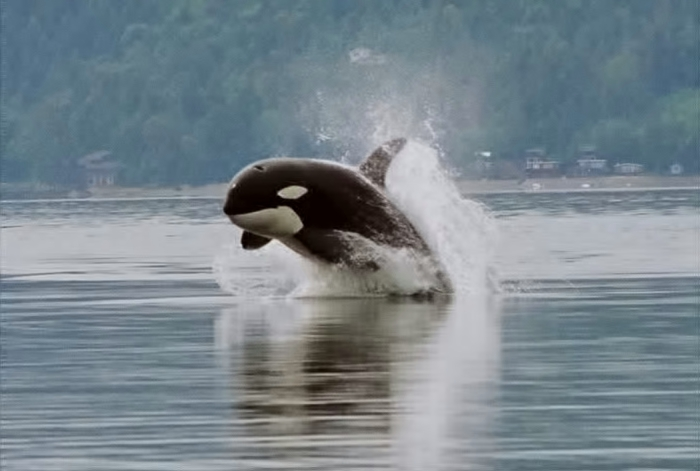
An orca breaching in the canal

Hood Canal and the rest of Puget Sound were created about 13,000 years ago, during the Late Pleistocene, by the Puget Lobe of the Cordilleran Ice Sheet.

== Fauna ==
Hood Canal has a population of salmon that return annually to spawn in local rivers; in 2024, local volunteers counted over 12,500 salmon in the Hood Canal drainage basin after the completion of several restoration projects. Killer whales have been spotted occasionally in Hood Canal, including members of the endangered southern resident population. In 2021, a pod spent 30 days in Hood Canal and reached as far as Belfair. The U.S. Navy began deployment of trained dolphins in Hood Canal in 2010 to patrol the areas around its submarine base at Bangor.

== History ==
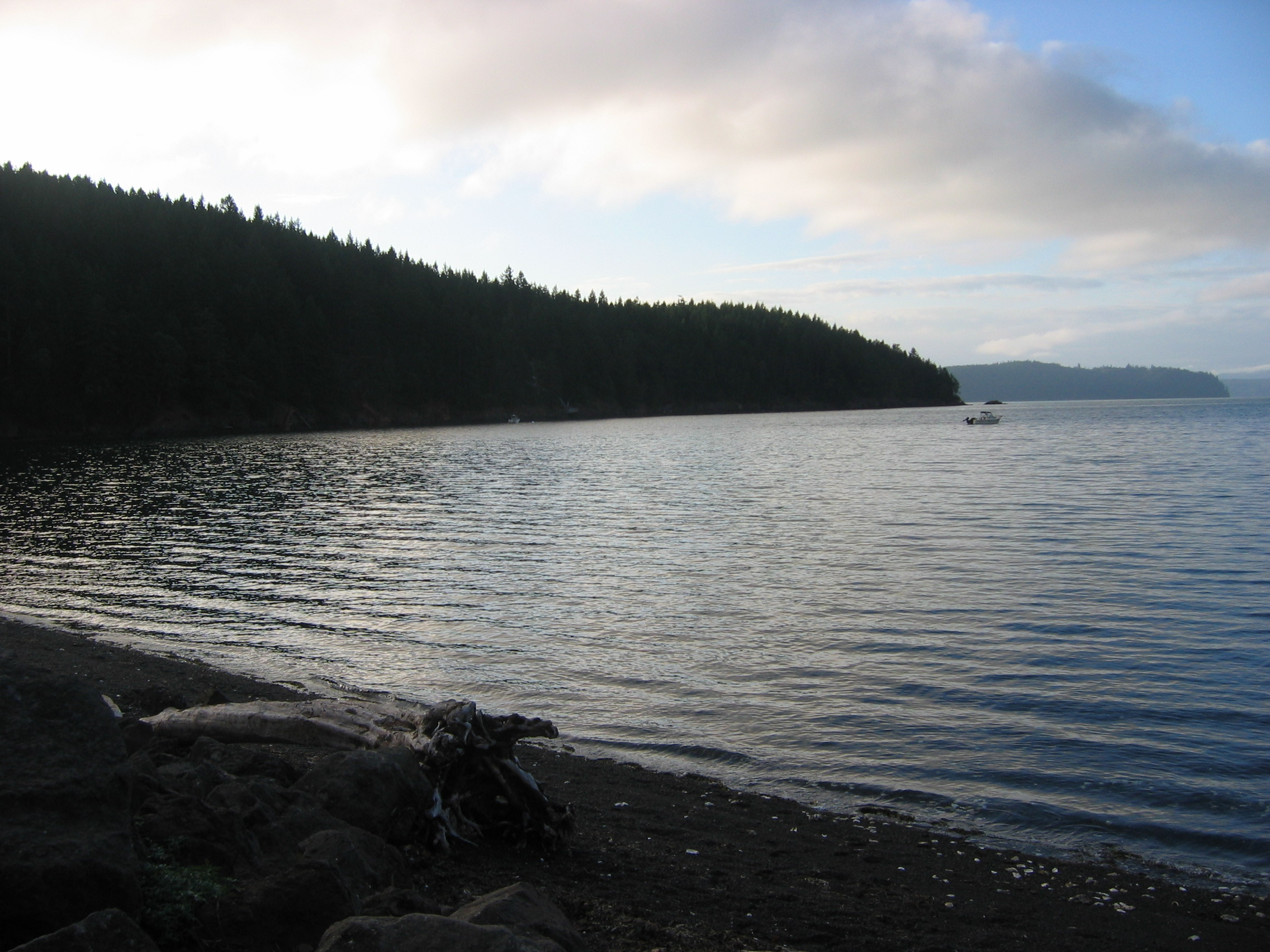
Hood Canal from Camp Parsons Boy Scout Camp

Hood Canal was named by the Royal Navy Captain George Vancouver on May 13, 1792, in honor of Admiral Lord Samuel Hood of that navy. Vancouver used the name "Hood's Channel" in his journal, but wrote "Hood's Canal" on his charts. The United States Board on Geographic Names decided on "Hood Canal" as its official name in 1932.

== Roads and bridges ==
U.S. Route 101 runs along the west shore of Hood Canal, south of Quilcene.

Hood Canal is spanned by the Hood Canal Bridge, the third longest floating bridge in the world at 6,521 feet (1,988 m). According to the Washington State Department of Transportation, the Hood Canal Bridge is the only floating bridge in the United States constructed on saltwater, although there are others, such as Nordhordland Bridge and Bergsøysund Bridge in Norway. The Hood Canal Bridge accommodates sixteen and a half foot tides.

== Recreation ==
State parks on the shores of Hood Canal including Belfair, Twanoh, Potlatch, Triton Cove, Scenic Beach, Dosewallips, and Kitsap Memorial. Prominent shoreside activities include swimming, boating, fishing and shellfish gathering.

Theler Wetlands is located at the tip of the Canal in Belfair. It provides a few miles of trails and a protected environment for marsh and estuary birds and plants.

There are many small towns located along the length of the Hood Canal, mostly on the western shore. The latter are near hiking and recreation within the Olympic National Forest and the Olympic National Park. Some of the more popular areas include Staircase Campground and Hama Hama Recreation Area and act as the gateways to miles of hiking trails through quiet, lush forests.

== Low oxygen levels ==
September 2006 marked the discovery of the largest dead zone in the history of Hood Canal. The dead zone may have been caused by low oxygen levels due to algal blooms. Algal blooms occur in part because of warm weather and the slow turnover of water in the southern end of the canal, causing the build-up of nutrients from fertilizers and leaky septic systems. Organic matter, brought in by ocean water and certain trees, could additionally be contributing to the high nitrogen levels in the basin. Excess nutrients and organic matter causes a body of water to lose oxygen, through a process called eutrophication. In Hood Canal, eutrophication has led to unwanted algae blooms. Nitrogen combined with sunlight triggers algal growth. A lack of sufficient consumers has resulted in a mass overgrowth of algae in the basin. When the algae die, bacteria feed and their populations explode, robbing the water of oxygen. A state of hypoxia is created.

The fish kill may also be part of a natural 50-year cycle of oxygen levels in the canal, which has merely been influenced (but not controlled) by anthropogenic activity. Natural causes of hypoxia in Hood Canal include the timing of freshwater inflows, water layer stratification resulting from seasonal changes in surface temperature, and climate change. The oxygen level may also be partially due to a change in wind direction. The prevailing north wind generally pushes oxygenated water into the oxygen-depleted area. A sustained south wind will cut off this source of oxygen. Coastal upwelling from the Strait of Juan de Fuca bring in a surplus of nutrients into the Puget Sound, but fail to circulate oxygen through Hood Canal. Chronic hypoxia is observed year-round. This area of low-oxygen is often seen in Lynch Cove, but has been spreading towards the mouth of Hood Canal.

In May 2006, divers searching for invasive species discovered a mat of marine bacteria covering a 4-mile (6.4 km) stretch where all normal sea life was dead. The mat dissipated five months later. Jan Newton, oceanographer at the University of Washington, said it was important to note that Hood Canal has had very low oxygen for a long time. Similar mats have been found near Tacoma, Washington; San Diego, California; New York City; and New Orleans, Louisiana. Hypoxia and its detrimental effects on fish have been documented in Hood Canal since the 1970s. But hypoxia's impacts on the area's wildlife have been more significantly linked to growing urbanization along the coast. A recent study determined dissolved oxygen (DO) content, or oxygen saturation, of the Sound's Main Basin to consistently stay around 5 mg/L from the 1950s up through 2005. DO concentration in Hood Canal, however, was identified to have dramatically decreased from 5–6 mg/L in the 1950s to less than 0.2 mg/L in the twenty-first century. As of 2000, the National Research Council defined hypoxia to occur at a DO level of <2 mg/L—making Hood Canal's current 0.2 mg/L composition far below life-sustaining conditions.

Hood Canal's hypoxic state has had devastating effects on the sub-basin's biodiversity. Valuable commercial species such as geoduck clam and Dungeness crab may be adversely affected by hypoxic conditions. Critically low oxygen levels, due to increased bacterial growth, were observed in the lower portion of Hood Canal during the summer months of 2004 and 2005. A low dissolved oxygen content in Anna's Bay and Lynch Cove is believed to have been responsible for the corresponding decline in spot shrimp catch by Skokomish Nation fishers within the same period of time. In 2010, there was a massive fish kill in the southern part of Hood Canal. Hundreds of fish and thousands of shrimp were found washed up onto the shore. Jan Newton, a local oceanographer, concluded that the water contained less than 1 milliliter per liter of dissolved oxygen and that such a low level is extremely stressful, often lethal, to the marine life in Hood Canal. The effects of Hood Canal's hypoxic conditions are clearly seen by the public through massive fish kills, but it is important to identify other harmful impacts resulting from a lack of oxygen in the basin. Eelgrass beds, which are nurseries for salmon and crab, have declined more in Hood Canal than any other area of the Puget Sound. Bottom dwelling rockfish have also seen a decline due to a lack of eelgrass. Other notable cases of hypoxia and its adverse effects on biodiversity include the large-scale hypoxic zone that appears in the Gulf of Mexico each summer.

The Hood Canal Dissolved Oxygen Program (HCDOP), a partnership of 38 organizations, has been formed to combat the problem. This program will work with local, state, federal, and tribal government policy makers to evaluate potential corrective actions that will restore and maintain a level of dissolved oxygen that will reduce stress on marine life. The HCDOP-Integrated Assessment and Modeling study was started in 2005 to quantify marine processes and watershed loadings, assess biota-oxygen interactions, model key processes to measure drivers of oxygen, and to evaluate potential corrective actions. Government agencies, such as Puget Sound Partnership and the United States Geological Survey, have used HCDOP's publicly available information to conduct their own assessment and modeling studies of Hood Canal. Puget Sound Partnership is a Washington state agency responsible for protecting and restoring life in the Sound. The group is required to produce a "State of the Sound" report every two years. As of 2009, the Sound has recently shown signs of increased stress and degradation from human activity. A noticeable drop in spawning rates has had a negative effect on the ecosystem's biodiversity and available habitats continue to decline. But the abundance of some species, like the Chinook salmon, have advanced and limited loadings of polycyclic aromatic hydrocarbon (PAHs) to Elliott Bay has improved water quality there.

Though difficult to regulate, a majority of proposed solutions have recommended the regulation of harmful, nearby anthropogenic practices. Human development has caused the most significant damage to Hood Canal's ecosystem. The runoff from septic tanks dumps large quantities of nitrogen into the canal following each rainfall. The best way to solve this problem is to work with the community to create state of the art sewage treatment plants or, at the very least, upgrade old and damaged septic systems to prevent leaks. Several of Puget Sound's counties have taken it upon themselves to create detailed on-site sewage codes. Because the Hood Canal region has experienced logging, as have the majority of watersheds around Puget Sound, the surrounding forests have become heavily degraded. This has caused nitrogen-rich Alder forests to leach excess nutrients into the water. Restoring wetlands along Hood Canal and restoring native plant life with low nitrogen impacts could help ameliorate this phenomenon. Since wetlands are great filters for the environment, this could prove a very effective way of lowering the impact of nitrogen on the basin. Coastal upwellings and tides are a huge issue for Hood Canal. Because of the lack of upwelling and tides pushing in oxygen rich waters into the canal, the area's oxygen content suffers. Unfortunately, since the Puget Sound ecosystem is so large, it would be very difficult to oxygenate deeper waters. But surface-level DO could be improved by restoring natural flows of estuaries.

== Icing over ==
During a week of record-breaking cold temperatures in December 2009, parts of Hood Canal developed a thin layer of ice, thicker near the shoreline.

== See also ==
- Fjords of the United States
- Puget Sound – Sound in Washington, United States
