= Mount Worthington (Washington) =

Mountain in Washington, USA

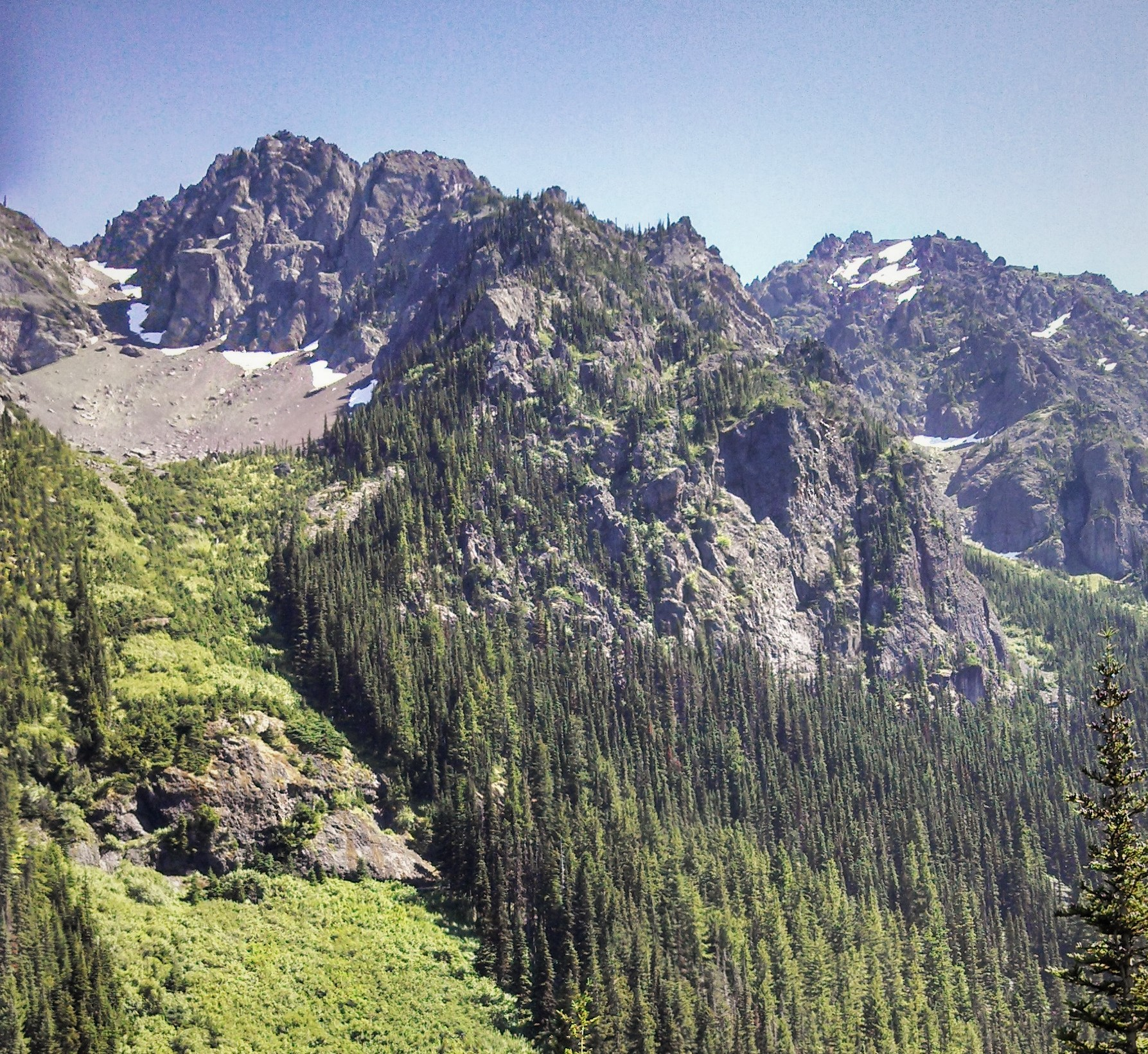
- North aspect. Northeast peak left, summit to right

Highest point
- Elevation: 6,938 ft (2,115 m)
- Prominence: 498 ft (152 m)
- Parent peak: Buckhorn Mountain (6,988 ft)
- Isolation: 1.04 mi (1.67 km)
- Coordinates: 47°50′14″N 123°06′00″W

Geography
- Location within Washington (state) Location within the United States
- Country: United States
- State: Washington
- County: Jefferson
- Protected area: Buckhorn Wilderness
- Parent range: Olympic Mountains
- Topo map: USGS Mount Townsend

Geology
- Rock age: Eocene

Climbing
- Easiest route: class 3 scramble

Mount Worthington is a 6,938-foot (2,115-metre) elevation double-summit mountain located in the eastern Olympic Mountains in Jefferson County of Washington state. It is set within Buckhorn Wilderness, on land managed by the Olympic National Forest. The nearest neighbor is Iron Mountain, 0.76 mi (1.22 km) to the southwest, and the nearest higher peak is Buckhorn Mountain, 1.3 mi (2.1 km) to the southwest. Precipitation runoff from Mount Worthington drains south into the Big Quilcene River, or north into Copper Creek which is a tributary of the Dungeness River. This mountain was first known as Copper Peak, but was renamed by Jack Christensen for the William J. Worthington family, pioneers of nearby Quilcene. Copper was mined in the Tubal Cain mine at the northern base of this mountain in the early 1900s. In the same vicinity of the abandoned mine are the remains of a modified B-17 plane that crashed on January 19, 1952, when returning from a search-and-rescue mission.

== Climate ==
Mount Worthington is located in the marine west coast climate zone of western North America. Weather fronts originating in the Pacific Ocean travel northeast toward the Olympic Mountains. As fronts approach, they are forced upward by the peaks (orographic lift), causing them to drop their moisture in the form of rain or snow. As a result, the Olympics experience high precipitation, especially during the winter months in the form of snowfall. Because of maritime influence, snow tends to be wet and heavy, resulting in avalanche danger. During winter months weather is usually cloudy, but due to high pressure systems over the Pacific Ocean that intensify during summer months, there is often little or no cloud cover during the summer.

== Geology ==
The Olympic Mountains are composed of obducted clastic wedge material and oceanic crust, primarily Eocene sandstone, turbidite, and basaltic oceanic crust. The mountains were sculpted during the Pleistocene era by erosion and glaciers advancing and retreating multiple times.

== Gallery ==
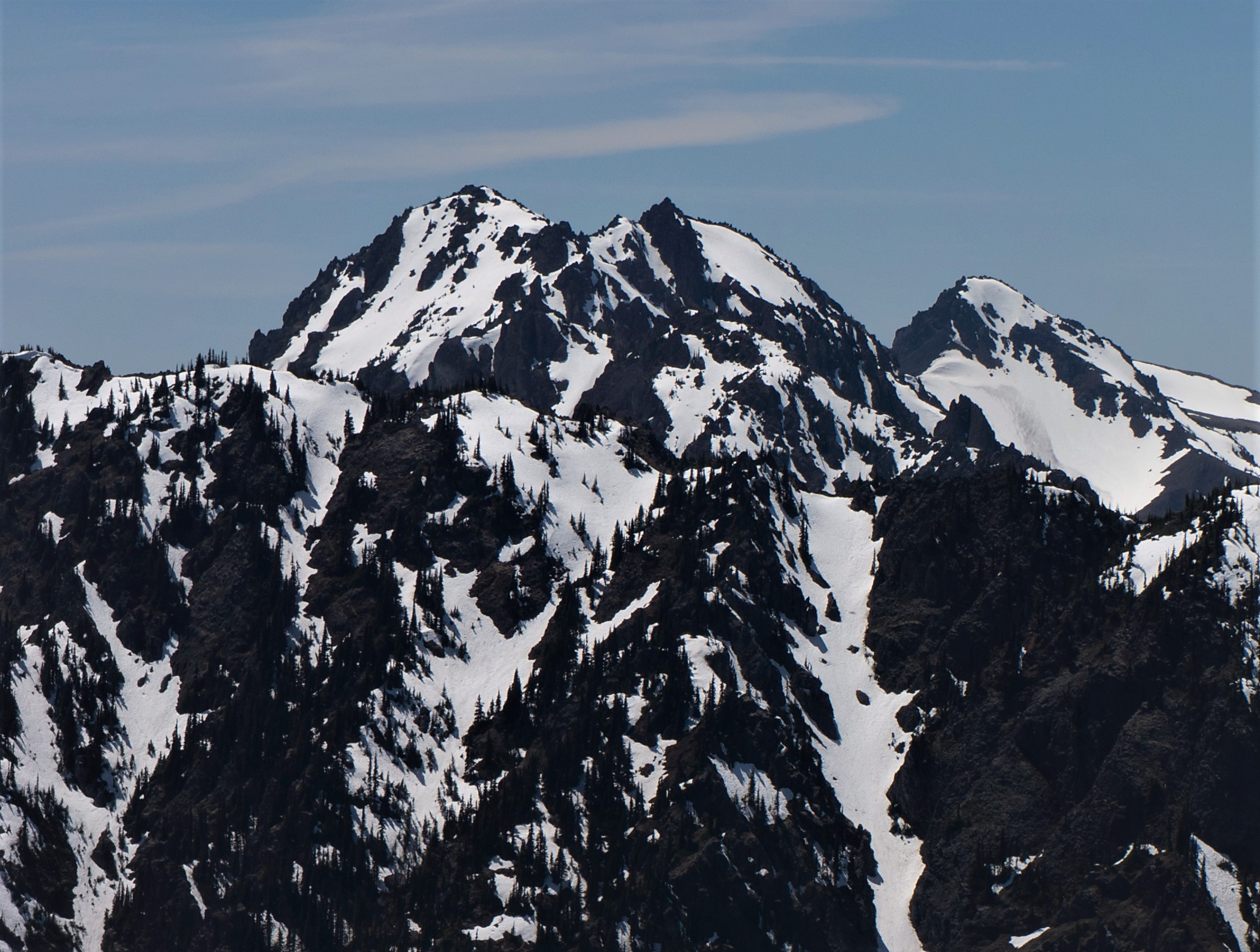
Mt. Worthington (centered), Buckhorn Mountain (right) seen from Mt. Townsend.

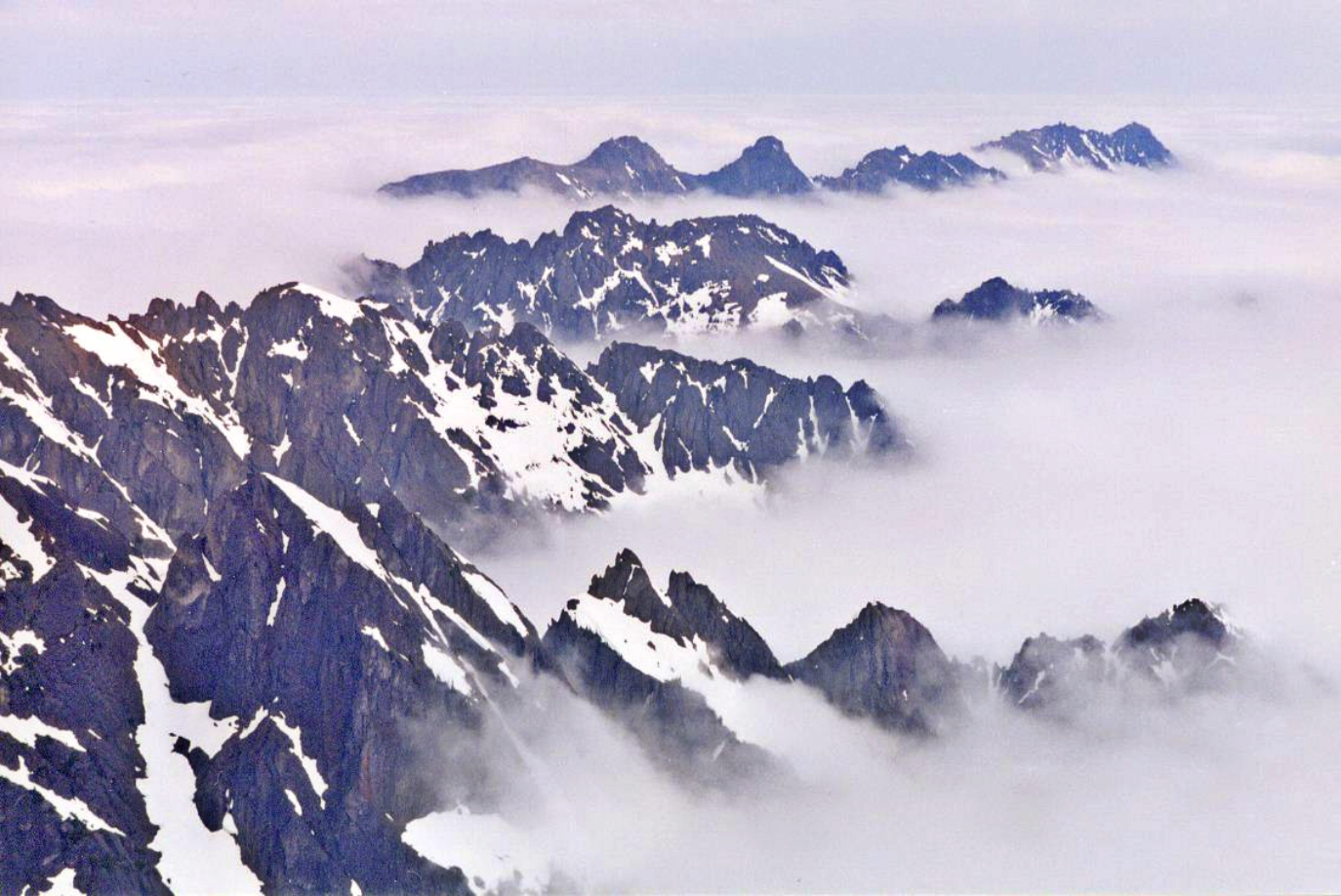
View from Mount Constance with Mt. Worthington in upper right corner

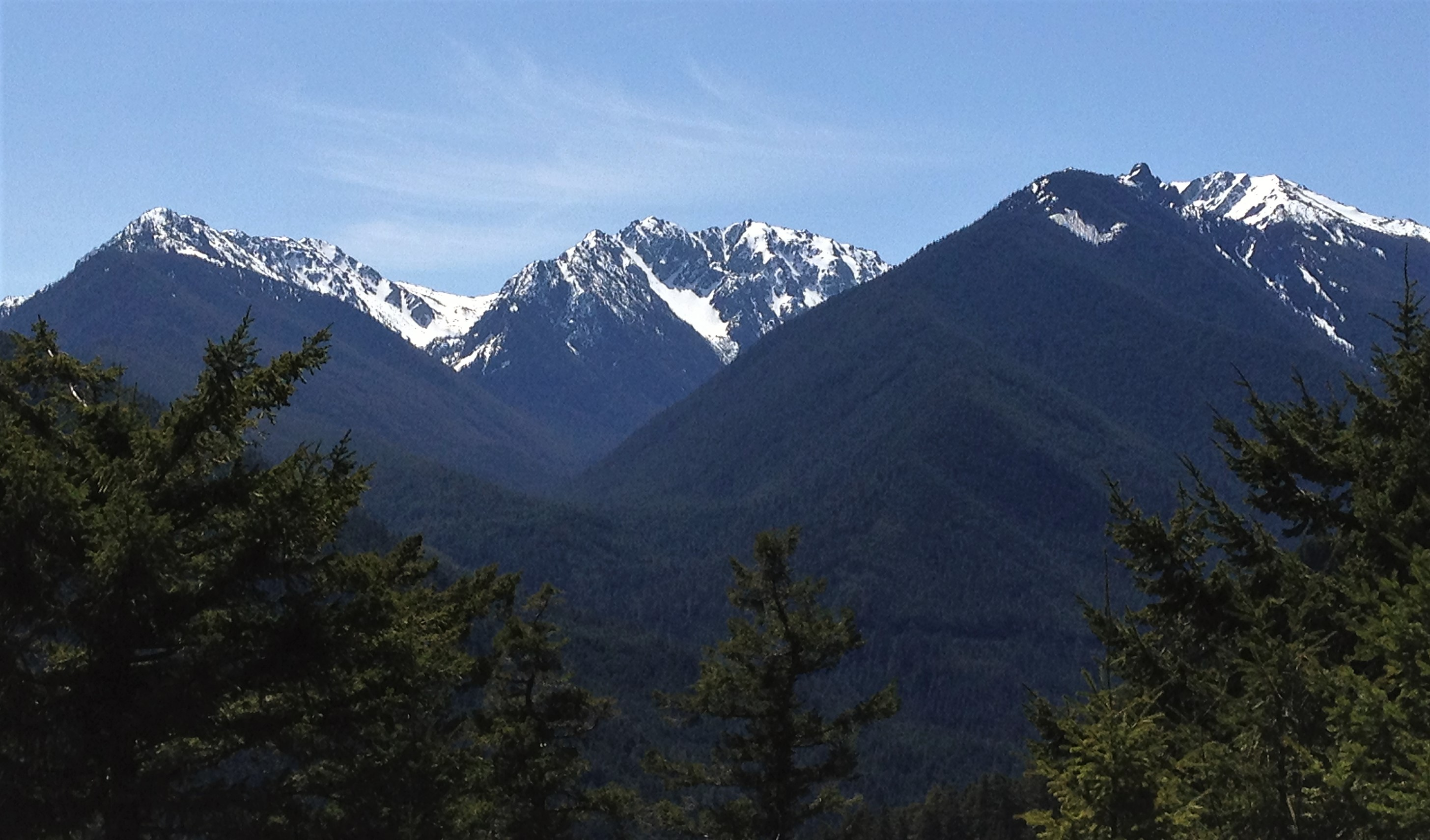
Mt. Worthington centered, north aspect

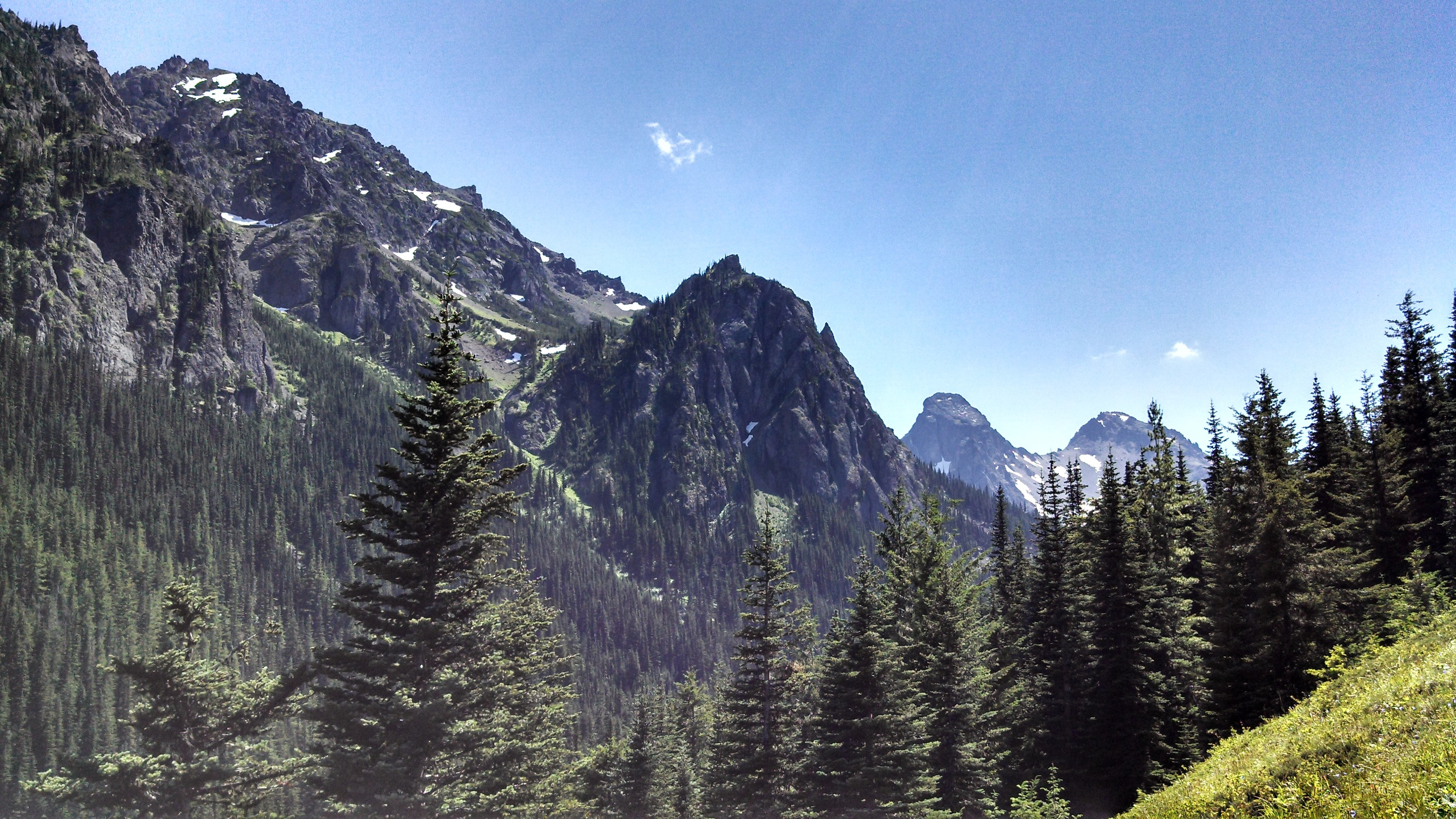
Mt. Worthington (left), Buckhorn Mountain (right) seen from Tubal Cain Trail

== See also ==
- Geology of the Pacific Northwest
- Geography of Washington (state)
