= Marmot Pass =

Mountain pass in Washington

- Location within Washington (state) Location within the United States
- Elevation: 6,231 ft (1,899 m)

Location
- Location: Jefferson County, Washington, U.S.
- Range: Olympic Mountains
- Coordinates: 47°49′40″N 123°08′01″W

Marmot Pass, at 6,231 feet (1,899 m)-high, provides a trail corridor through the Buckhorn Wilderness in the Olympic Mountains of Washington state. The pass is situated near Buckhorn Mountain (6,870 feet), Iron Mountain (6,804 feet), and Boulder Ridge (6,852 feet). From Marmot Pass, one can see the tallest peaks in the mountain range, and look down at the Dungeness Valley, and Hood Canal. Furthermore, it's been said Seattle fireworks are sometimes visible from the pass on the 4th of July.

The trail route to the pass is a 5.8-mile (9.3 km) trip for hikers, beginning at the rolling Big Quilcene River. En route to the pass, one travels through old growth forest to broad meadows, gaining about 3,500 feet (1,100 m) in the process but being rewarded by spacious vistas.

Venturing above the pass onto a ridge leading to Buckhorn Mountain, one can get views beyond the Olympic Mountains, including Mount Baker, Glacier Peak, Mount St. Helens, and Mount Adams.

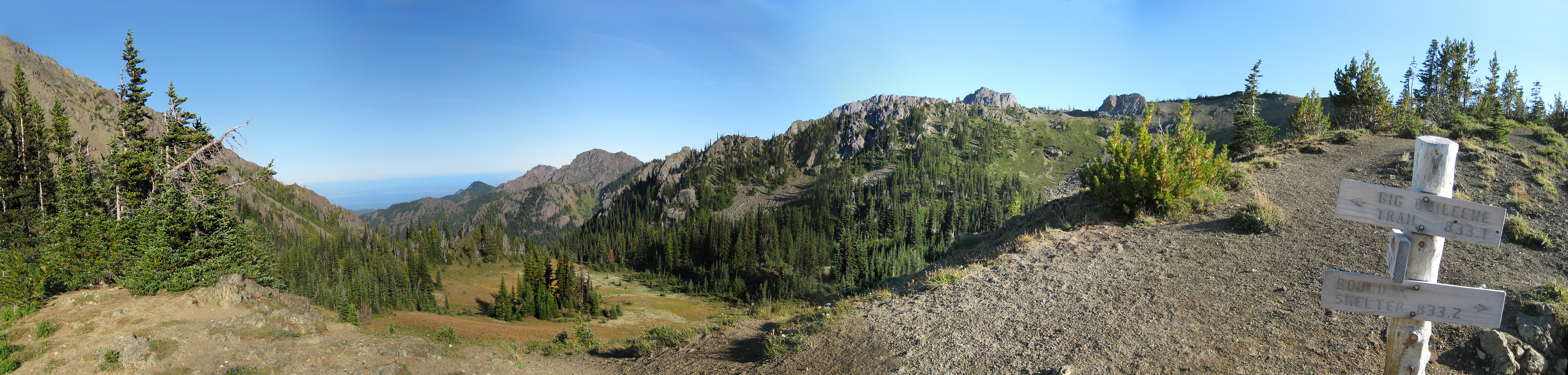
Looking Eastward: 180° panorama at the crest of Marmot Pass in the Buckhorn Wilderness of the Olympic National Forest in Washington State. Iron Mountain appears on the left-hand side with Puget Sound and Hood Canal visible in the middle.
