= Mount Constance =

Mountain in Washington (state), United States

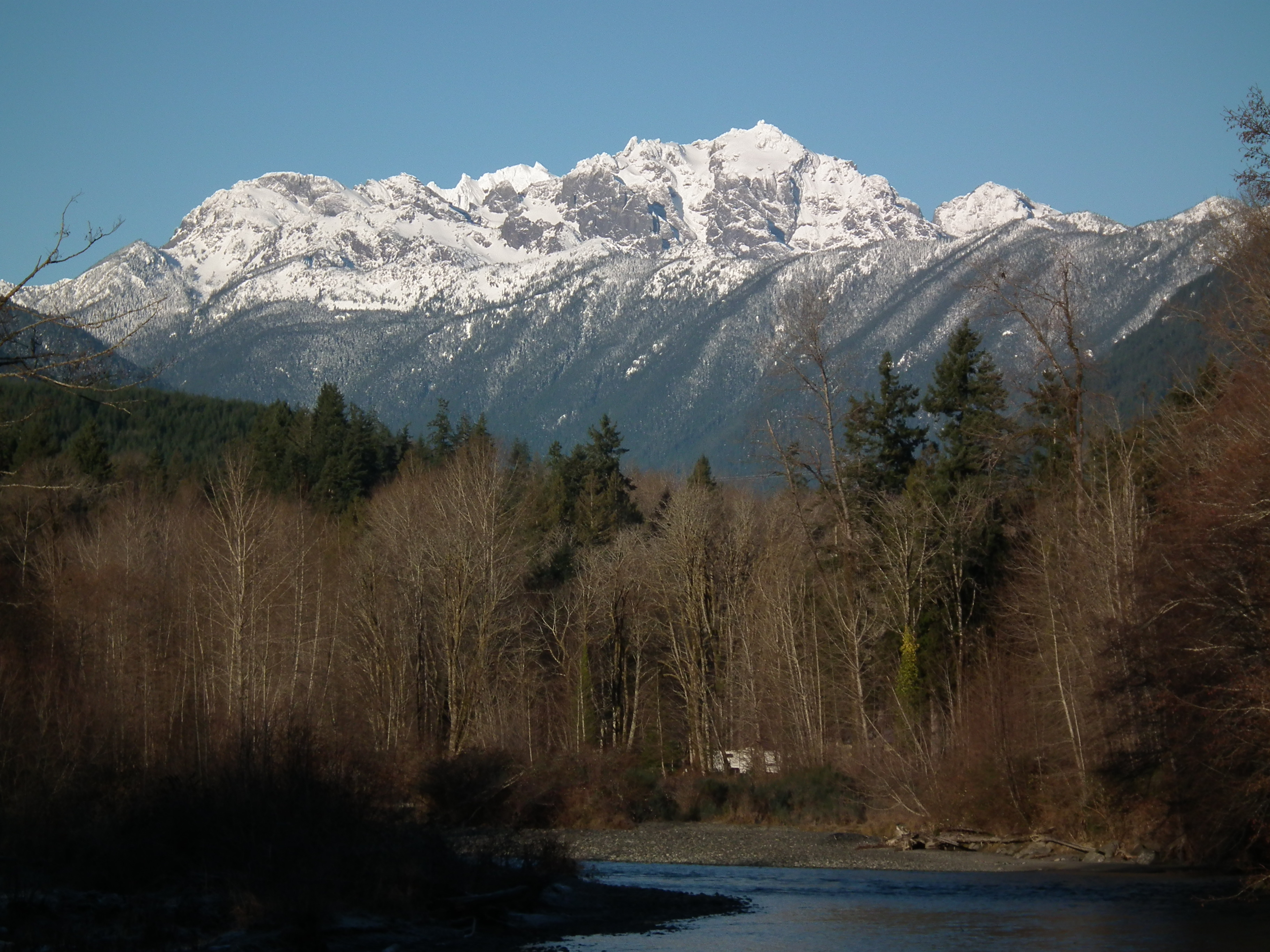
- View from U.S. Highway 101 in Dosewallips State Park

Highest point
- Elevation: 7,756 ft (2,364 m)
- Prominence: 1,956 ft (596 m)
- Parent peak: Mount Deception (7,788 ft)
- Isolation: 5.67 mi (9.12 km)
- Coordinates: 47°46′22″N 123°07′38″W

Geography
- Location within Washington (state) Location within the United States
- Location: Jefferson County, Washington, U.S.
- Parent range: Olympic Mountains
- Topo map: USGS Mount Deception

Geology
- Rock age: Eocene
- Rock type: Basalt

Climbing
- First ascent: 1922 by Robert Schellin and A.E. Smith
- Easiest route: Rock & Ice climb

Mount Constance is a peak in the Olympic Mountains of Washington and the third highest in the range. It is the most visually prominent peak on Seattle's western skyline. Despite being almost as tall as the ice-clad Mount Olympus to the west, Mount Constance has little in the way of glaciers and permanent snow because the eastern, and particularly this northeastern, portion of the Olympics receives far less precipitation. However the narrow and steep Crystal Glacier still exists on the mountain's north face, shaded by the bulk of the main peak and with a small lake at its terminus. In addition, the treeline is higher here than mountains to the west, also hinting at the drier alpine conditions.

By virtue of its position at the eastern edge of the Olympics, Mount Constance also enjoys spectacular vertical relief. For example, it rises over 6,900 feet (2,100 m) above the Dosewallips River to the south in only 3 horizontal miles (4.8 km). It is also only 12 miles (20 km) from the tidewater of Hood Canal. The summit of Mount Constance lies on the boundary between Olympic National Park and Buckhorn Wilderness. The Constance massif includes Mount Constance, Inner Constance, the twin peaks of Warrior to the north, as well as numerous subsidiary summits on rocky southern ridges enclosing the cirque basin that contains Lake Constance.

== History ==
In 1853, surveyor George Davidson named three mountains in the Olympics. He named Mount Ellinor for Ellinor Fauntleroy, who later became his wife, Mount Constance for Ellinor's older sister and The Brothers for her two brothers.

A U.S. Army transport plane from McChord Field crashed 800 feet (240 m) below the peak of Mount Constance in September 1941, killing all six aboard. 21 March 1975: an air traffic controller confused aircraft call signs and cleared a McChord AFB based C-141A, 64–0641, of the 62d Military Airlift Wing, to descend below safe minimums and it impacted Mount Constance in the Olympic National Forest, Washington, killing 16 passengers and crew

== Climate ==
Based on the Köppen climate classification, Mount Constance is located in the marine west coast climate zone of western North America. Most weather fronts originate in the Pacific Ocean, and travel northeast toward the Olympic Mountains. As fronts approach, they are forced upward by the peaks of the Olympic Range, causing them to drop their moisture in the form of rain or snowfall (Orographic lift). As a result, the Olympics experience high precipitation, especially during the winter months. Because of maritime influence, snow tends to be wet and heavy, resulting in avalanche danger. During winter months, weather is usually cloudy, but, due to high pressure systems over the Pacific Ocean that intensify during summer months, there is often little or no cloud cover during the summer. The months July through September offer the most favorable weather for viewing or climbing this peak.

== Geology ==
The Olympic Mountains are composed of obducted clastic wedge material and oceanic crust, primarily Eocene sandstone, turbidite, and basaltic oceanic crust. The mountains were sculpted during the Pleistocene era by erosion and glaciers advancing and retreating multiple times.

== Climbing ==
Routes on the mountain are from Class 3 to mid-Class 5, with ratings from Grade 2 to Grade 4. Mount Constance was first climbed in 1922 by R. Schellin and A.E. Smith from the southeast.

=== Access ===
Boulder Ridge (including the Gargoyles, Charlia Lakes, Cloudy Peak, Alphabet Ridge, and Warrior) and Home Lake / Constance Pass are readily accessed via the Buckhorn Wilderness Area (U.S. Forest Service) side of the Upper Dungeness River Trail and Marmot Pass. An alternative approach to the Mount Constance massif—including Inner Constance and the twin peaks of Warrior—is via the Dosewallips River Trailhead off of US 101 and Hood Canal. A third alternative is to access the Constance massif via Quilcene logging roads (FS 2700 aka "Penny Creek Road" off U.S. 101) leading to a brief 6 to 7 miles (10 to 11 km) ascent to Tunnel Creek Ridge and the high alpine shores of Harrison Lake. Views of the east side of Mount Constance and Warrior are available from these roads (the lower portions of which are paved) which actually connect to FS 2800 and the Dungeness / Sequim area via the 5000-foot Bon Jon Pass.

== Gallery ==
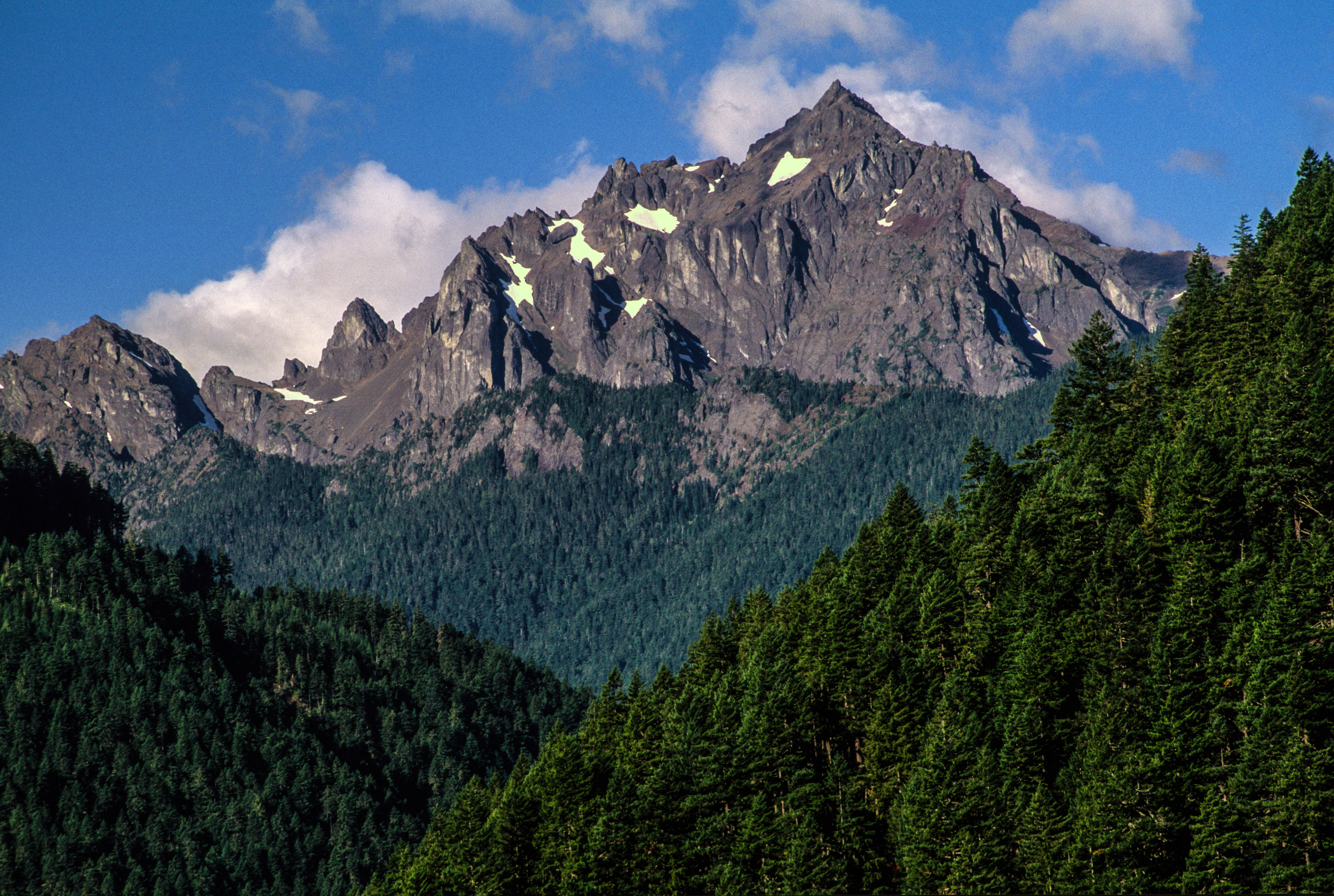
Mt. Constance from ENE (Tunnel Creek area)

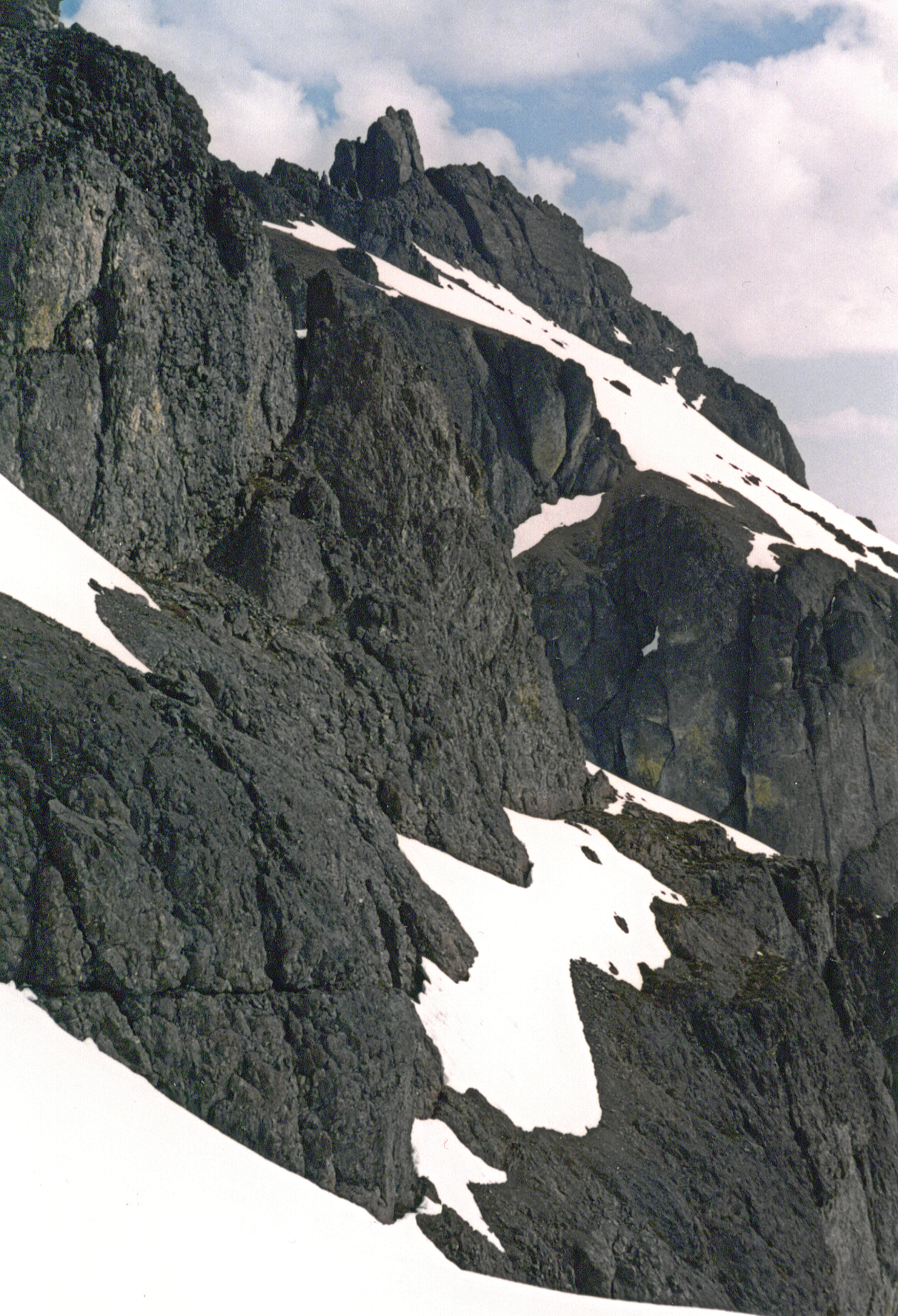
The summit block of Mount Constance

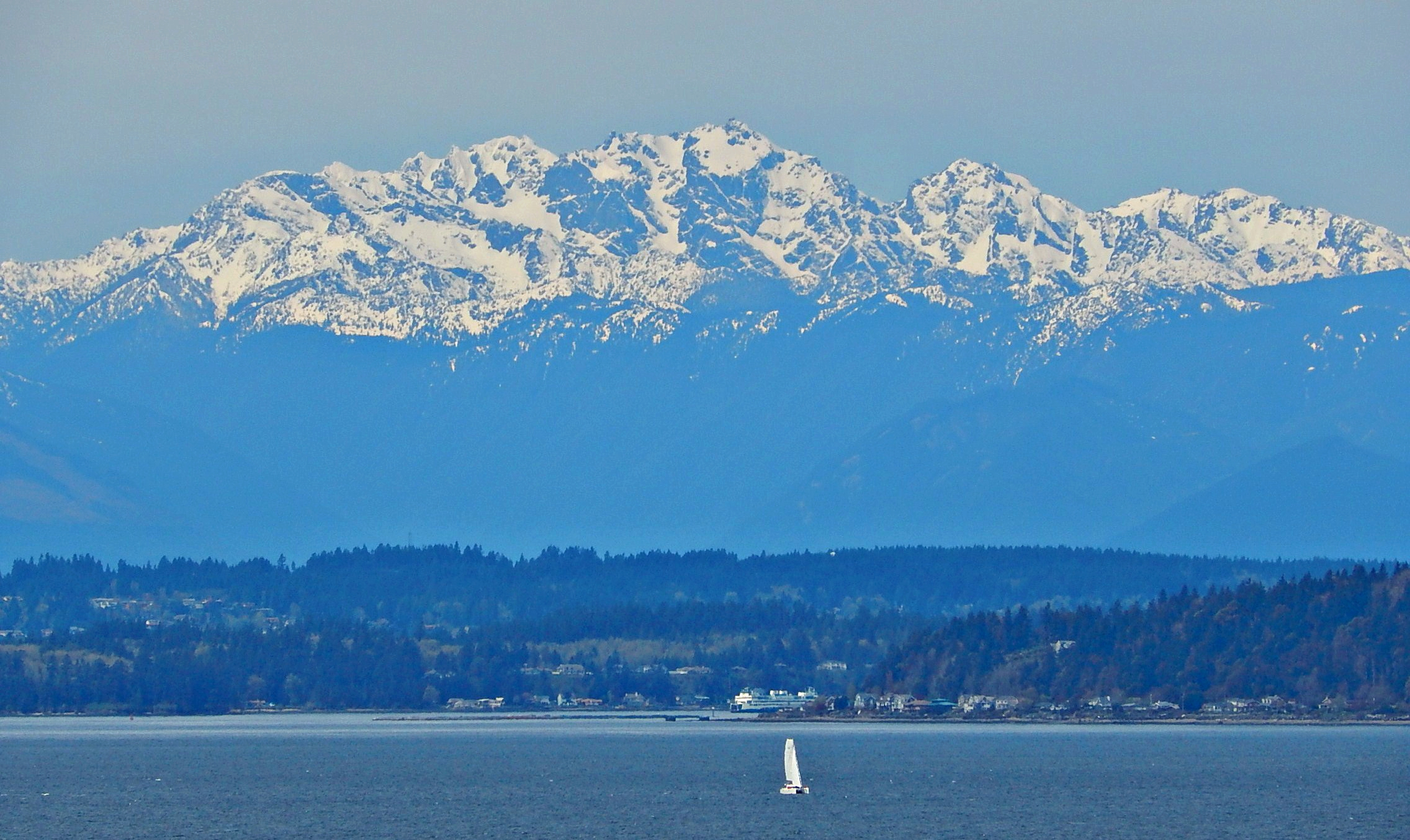
Constance from West Seattle

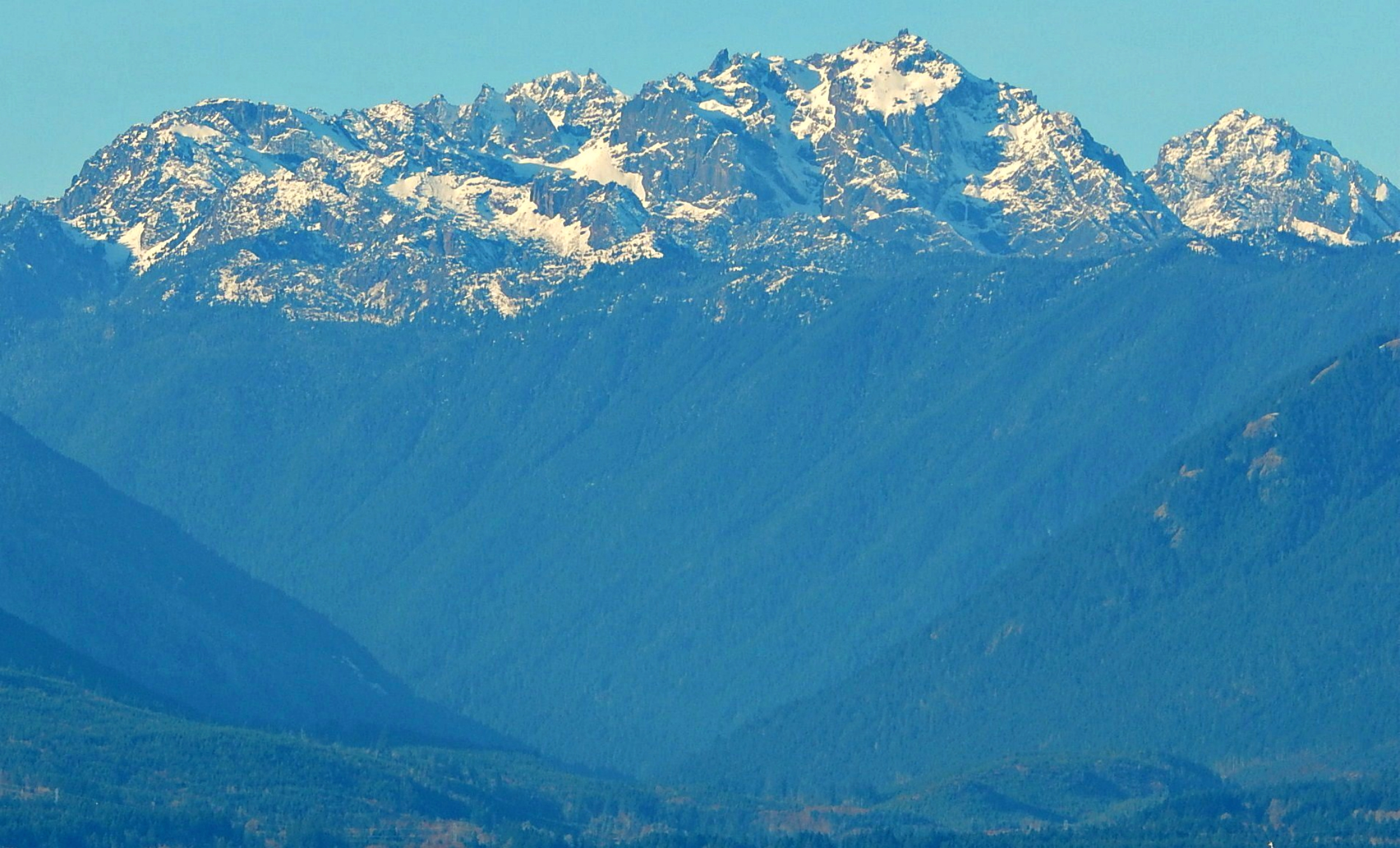
Constance seen from Hood Canal

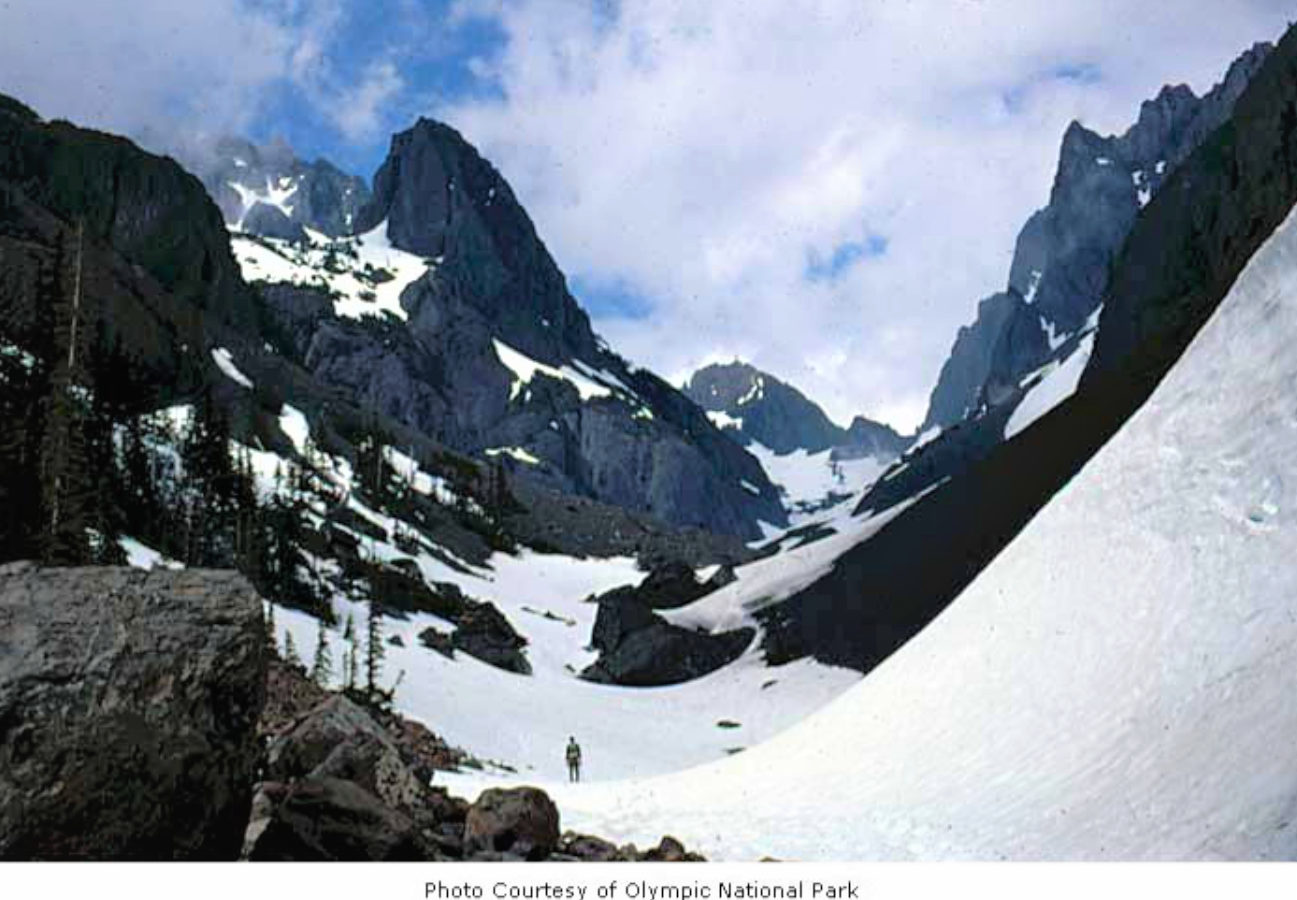
Avalanche Canyon of Mt. Constance

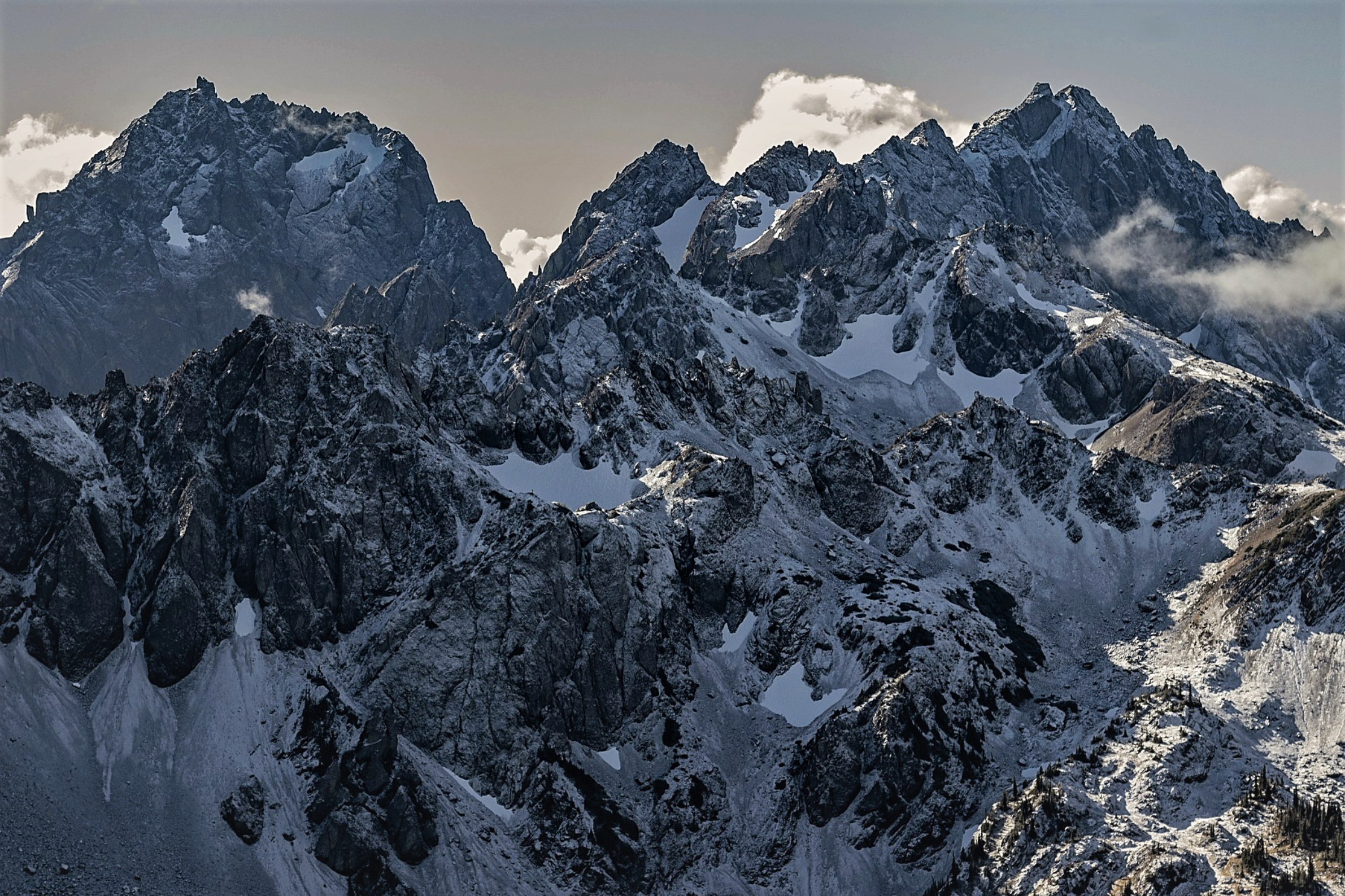
North aspect of Constance from Buckhorn Mountain

== See also ==
- Olympic Mountains
- Geology of the Pacific Northwest
