= Boulder Ridge =

Mountain in Washington (state), United States

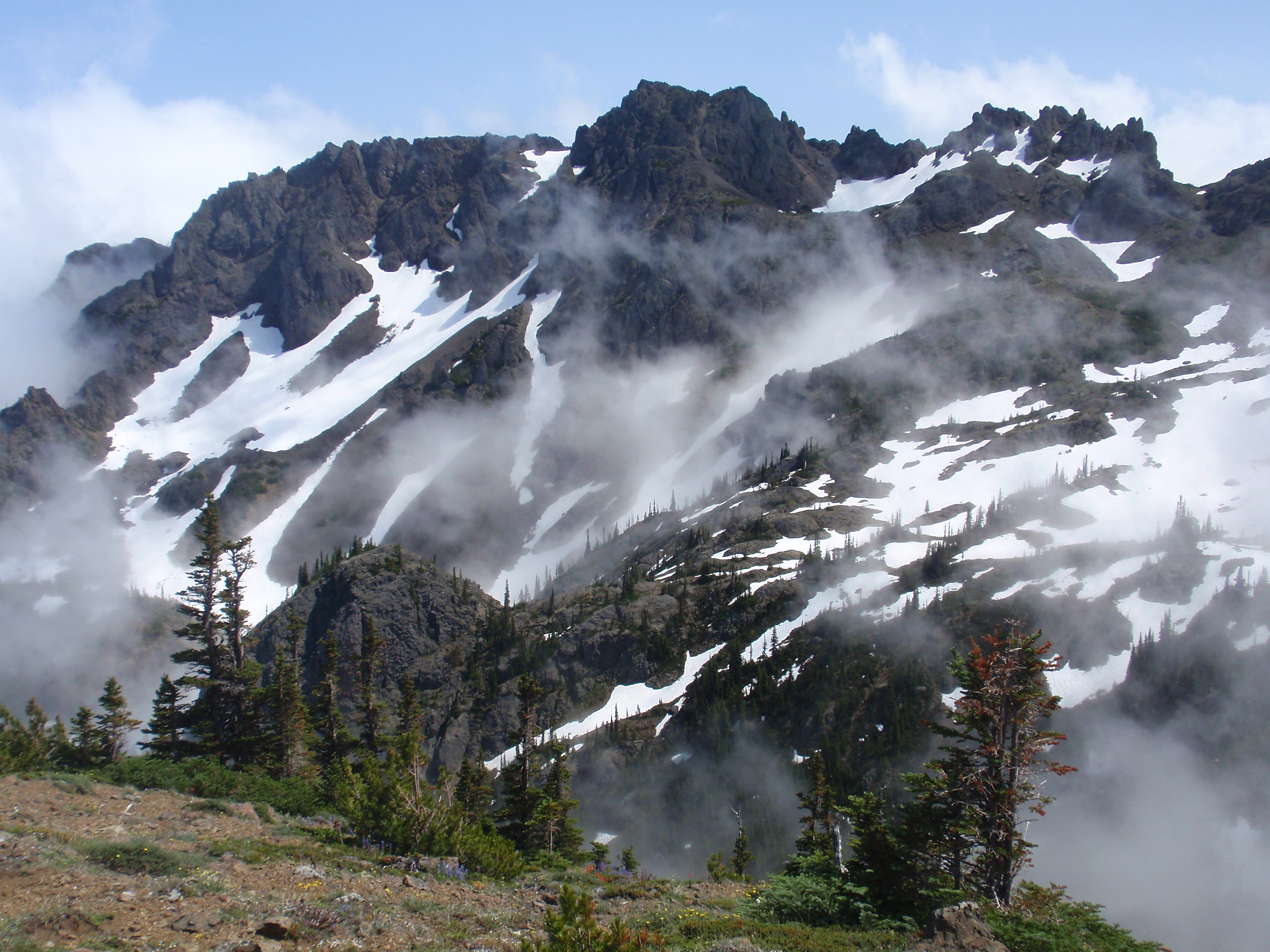
- Boulder Ridge, north aspect, seen from the Marmot Pass area

Highest point
- Elevation: 6,852 ft (2,088 m)
- Prominence: 572 ft (174 m)
- Coordinates: 47°48′25″N 123°07′28″W

Geography
- Location within Washington (state) Location within the United States
- Country: United States
- State: Washington
- County: Jefferson
- Protected area: Buckhorn Wilderness
- Parent range: Olympic Mountains
- Topo map: USGS Mount Townsend

Geology
- Rock age: Eocene
- Rock type: Tilted pillow Basalt

Climbing
- Easiest route: Marmot Pass class 2 Scramble

Boulder Ridge is a 6,852-foot (2,088-metre) elevation mountain ridge located in the eastern Olympic Mountains in Jefferson County of Washington state. It is set within Buckhorn Wilderness on land managed by the Olympic National Forest. The nearest higher neighbor is Alphabet Ridge, 0.94 mi (1.51 km) to the south, and Buckhorn Mountain rises 1.3 mi (2.1 km) to the north. Precipitation runoff from Boulder Ridge drains east into headwaters of the Big Quilcene River, west into tributaries of Dungeness River, and south into Charlia Lakes, thence Tunnel Creek.

== Climate ==
Based on the Köppen climate classification, Boulder Ridge is located in the marine west coast climate zone of western North America. Weather fronts originating in the Pacific Ocean travel northeast toward the Olympic Mountains. As fronts approach, they are forced upward by the peaks (orographic lift), causing them to drop their moisture in the form of rain or snow. As a result, the Olympics experience high precipitation, especially during the winter months in the form of snowfall. Because of maritime influence, snow tends to be wet and heavy, resulting in avalanche danger. During winter months weather is usually cloudy, but due to high pressure systems over the Pacific Ocean that intensify during summer months, there is often little or no cloud cover during the summer. The months July through September offer the most favorable weather for viewing or climbing this peak.

== Geology ==
The Olympic Mountains are composed of obducted clastic wedge material and oceanic crust, primarily Eocene sandstone, turbidite, and basaltic oceanic crust. The mountains were sculpted during the Pleistocene era by erosion and glaciers advancing and retreating multiple times.

== Gallery ==
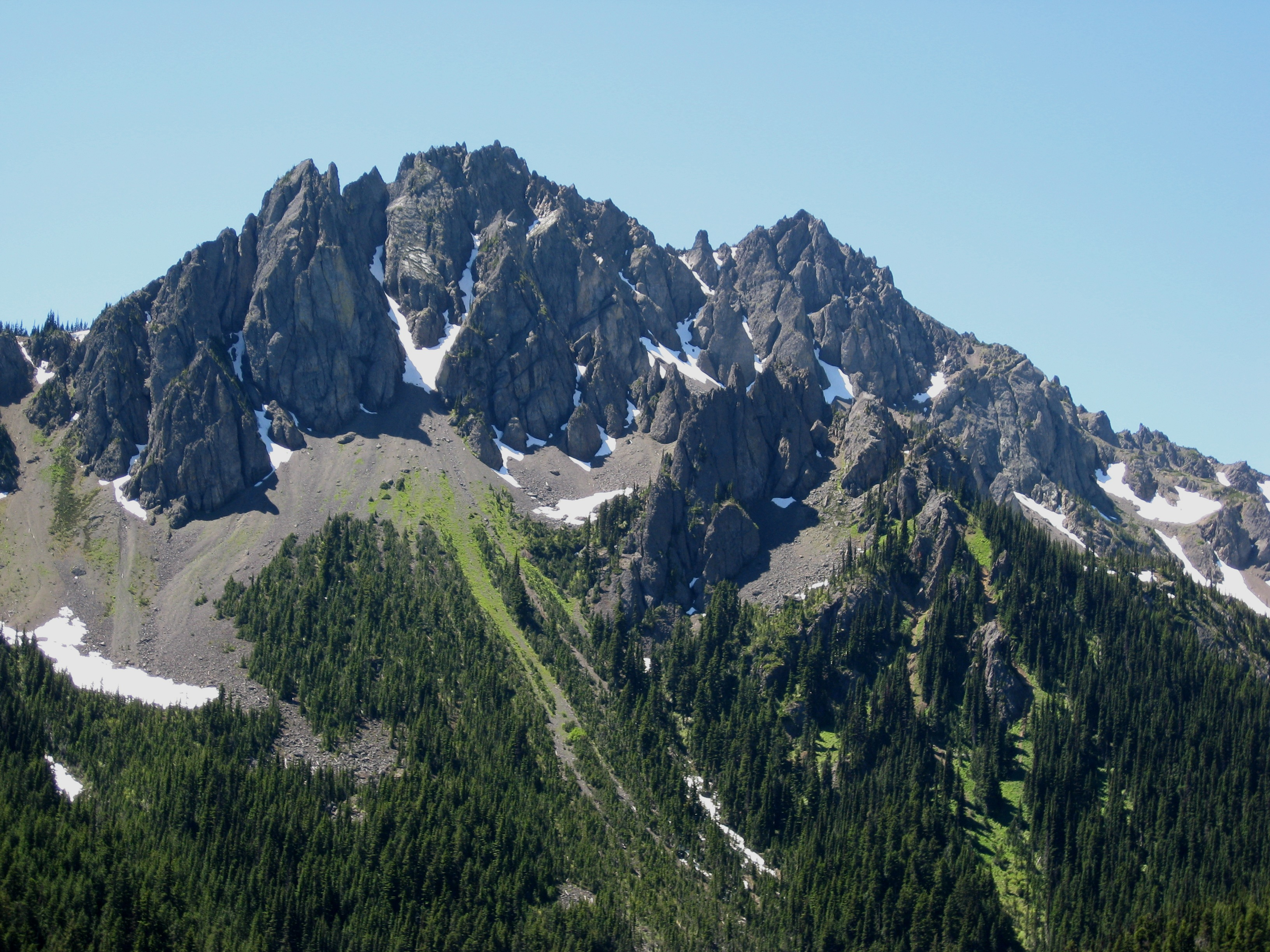
Boulder Ridge near Marmot Pass

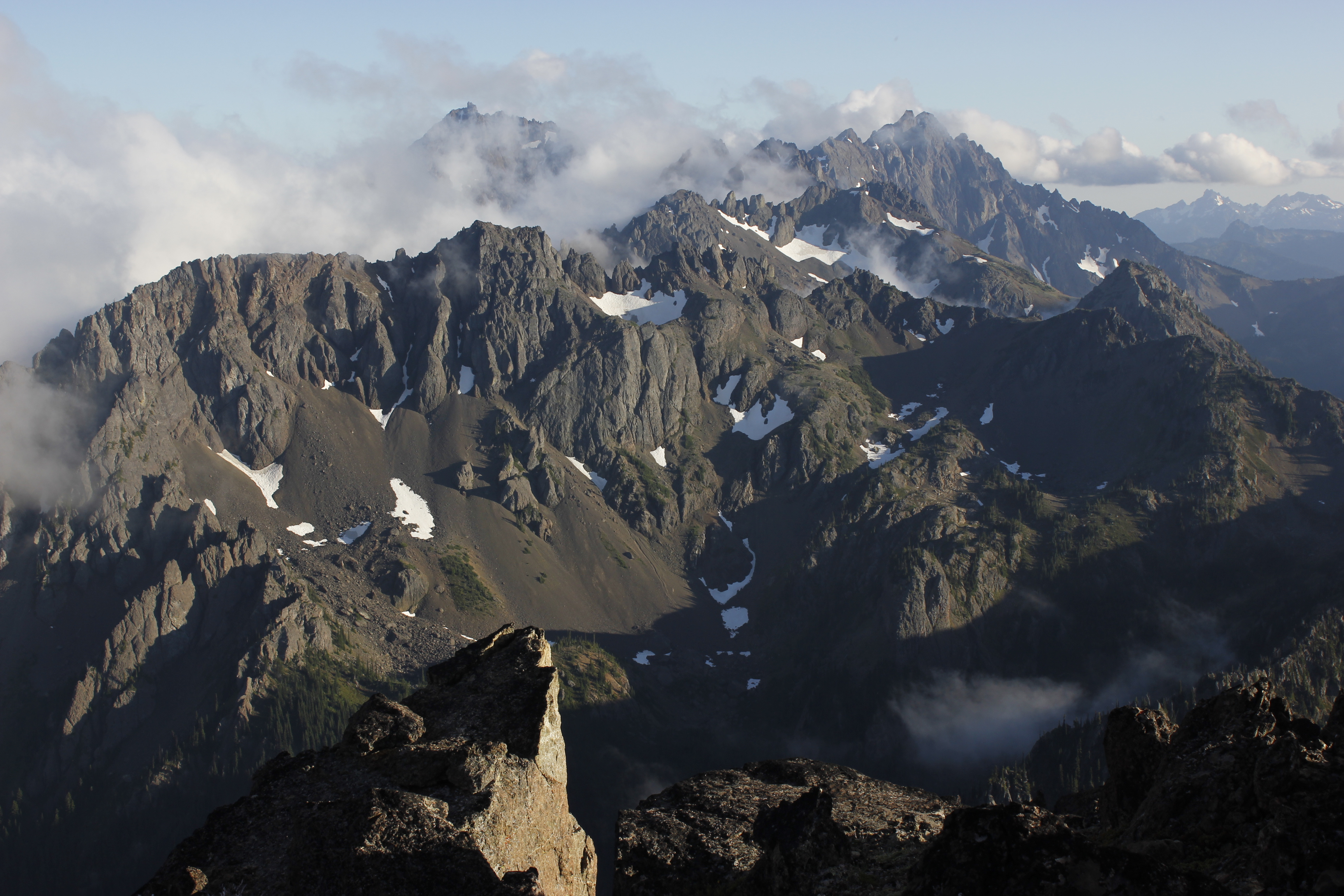
Boulder Ridge from Buckhorn Mountain

== See also ==
- Geology of the Pacific Northwest
- Geography of Washington (state)
