= Buckhorn Wilderness =

Mountainous wilderness area

- IUCN category Ib (wilderness area)
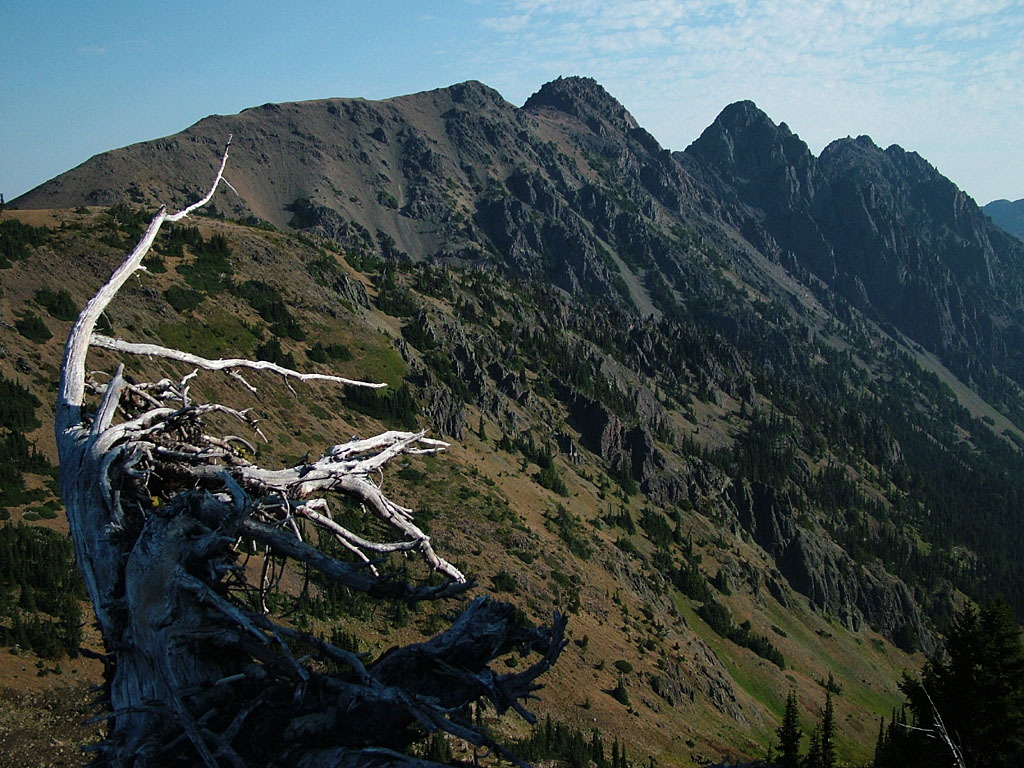
- Buckhorn Mountain as seen from the southwest

- Location within the United States
- Location: Jefferson / Clallam counties, Washington, USA
- Nearest city: Quilcene, WA
- Coordinates: 47°50′N 123°8′W
- Area: 44,319 acres (17,935 ha)
- Established: 1984
- Governing body: U.S. Forest Service
- Website: Buckhorn Wilderness

The Buckhorn Wilderness is a 44,319-acre (17,935 ha) mountainous wilderness area on the northeastern Olympic Peninsula in Washington, USA. Named after Buckhorn Mountain (6,988 ft or 2,130 m), the wilderness abuts the eastern boundary of Olympic National Park which includes nearby Mount Constance (7,756 ft or 2,364 m), Inner Constance (7,667 ft or 2,337 m), Warrior Peak (7,320 ft or 2,230 m), and Mount Deception (7,788 ft or 2,374 m).

== History ==
In 1984, the U.S. Congress established five wilderness areas within the Olympic National Forest:

- Buckhorn Wilderness
- Colonel Bob Wilderness
- Mount Skokomish Wilderness
- The Brothers Wilderness
- Wonder Mountain Wilderness

Buckhorn Wilderness is the largest of the five, all of which sit on the eastern flank of the Olympic Wilderness within Olympic National Park. Buckhorn Wilderness is administered by the Hood Canal Ranger District of the Olympic National Forest.

== Geography ==
The lowest elevations of the Buckhorn Wilderness are found in the lower parts of the three principal drainages: 2,470 feet (750 m) at the Big Quilcene River, 2,700 feet (820 m) at the Dungeness River, and 3,300 feet (1,000 m) at Townsend Creek. The highest point in the wilderness is 7,139 feet (2,176 m) at the summit of Mount Fricaba, which lies on the western boundary of the wilderness area, shared by Olympic National Park. The tallest peak entirely within the wilderness is Buckhorn Mountain at 6,988 feet (2,130 m). A notable historical site in the Buckhorn Wilderness is the Tubal Cain mine.

== Ecology ==
The wilderness lies within the rain shadow of the Olympic Mountains, resulting in a relatively drier climate. Despite this, the lowland forests (below about 4,000 feet (1,200 m)) are still dominated by stands of old-growth western red cedar, western hemlock, and Douglas fir, in addition to numerous understory organisms such as devil's club, salal, thimbleberry, fungi, and mosses. Above about 6,000 feet (1,800 m), alpine vegetation prevails where conditions are not too dry. Some slopes, such as the south side of Buckhorn Mountain, are rather arid above tree line due to fast-draining soils, sunny exposure, and low precipitation in the summer months.

== Recreation ==
More than 54 miles (87 km) of trails provide access to the wilderness for backpacking, horseback riding, mountain climbing, hunting, hiking, camping, viewing wildlife, and fishing.

== See also ==
- List of U.S. Wilderness Areas
- List of old growth forests
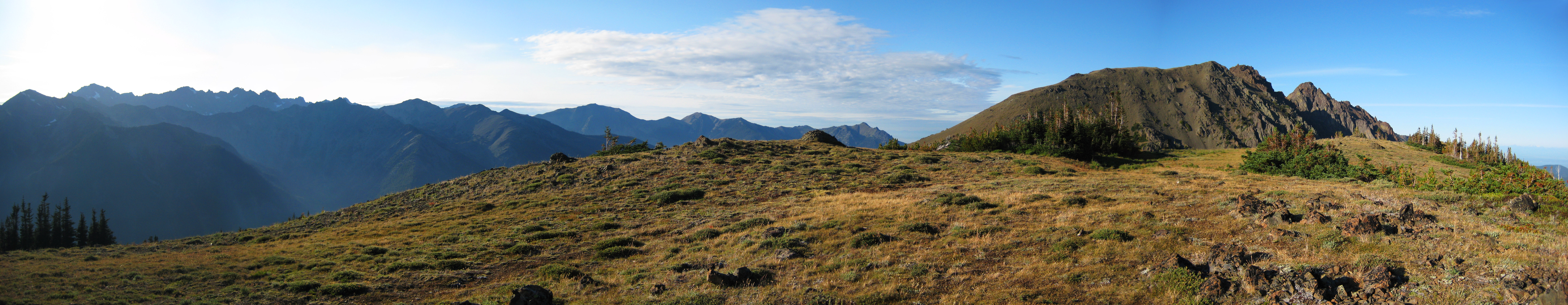
Panorama looking west-northwest to northeast from Marmot Pass in the Buckhorn Wilderness. Buckhorn Mountain and Iron Mountain can be seen in the far right side.
