= Warrior Peak =

Mountain in Washington (state), United States

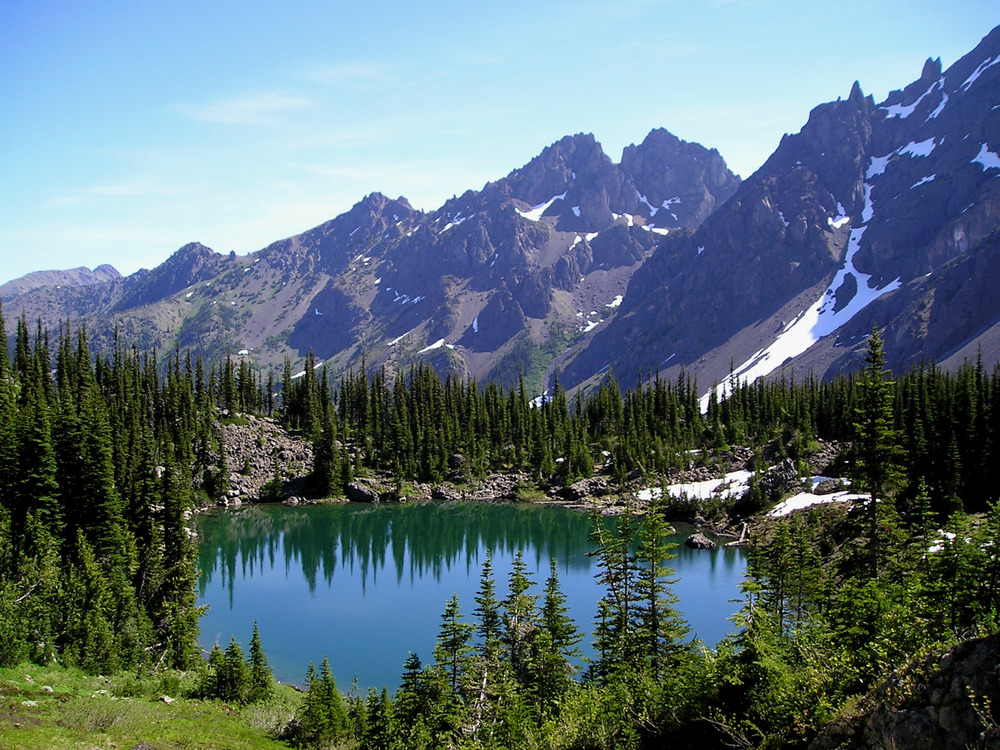
- Warrior Peak (centered) beyond Home Lake

Highest point
- Elevation: 7,320+ ft (2,230+ m)
- Prominence: 760 ft (232 m)
- Parent peak: Inner Constance
- Isolation: 0.83 mi (1.34 km)
- Coordinates: 47°47′03″N 123°08′01″W

Geography
- Location within Washington (state) Location within the United States
- Country: United States
- State: Washington
- County: Jefferson
- Protected area: Olympic National Park
- Parent range: Olympic Mountains
- Topo map: USGS Mount Deception

Geology
- Rock age: Eocene
- Rock type: pillow basalt

Climbing
- First ascent: 1945 Fred Beckey (solo)
- Easiest route: Scrambling class 3

Warrior Peak is a 7,320+ ft (2,230+ m) double summit mountain located in Olympic National Park and Jefferson County of Washington state. Warrior is the 11th-highest peak in the Olympic Mountains. The southeast summit is the slightly higher of the two summits, the northwest peak is estimated at 7,285 feet elevation. Precipitation runoff from the west side of the mountain drains into Home Creek, a tributary of the Dungeness River, whereas the east side drains into Tunnel Creek which is a tributary of the Big Quilcene River. Warrior Peak is easy to identify from Seattle, since it appears as the first prominent peak immediately north of Mount Constance, which is the dominant peak on the skyline. Warrior's nearest higher peak is Mount Constance, 0.8 mi (1.3 km) to the south-southeast. The first ascent of the mountain was made in 1945 by Fred Beckey, who solo climbed both summits, and named the mountain.

== Climate ==
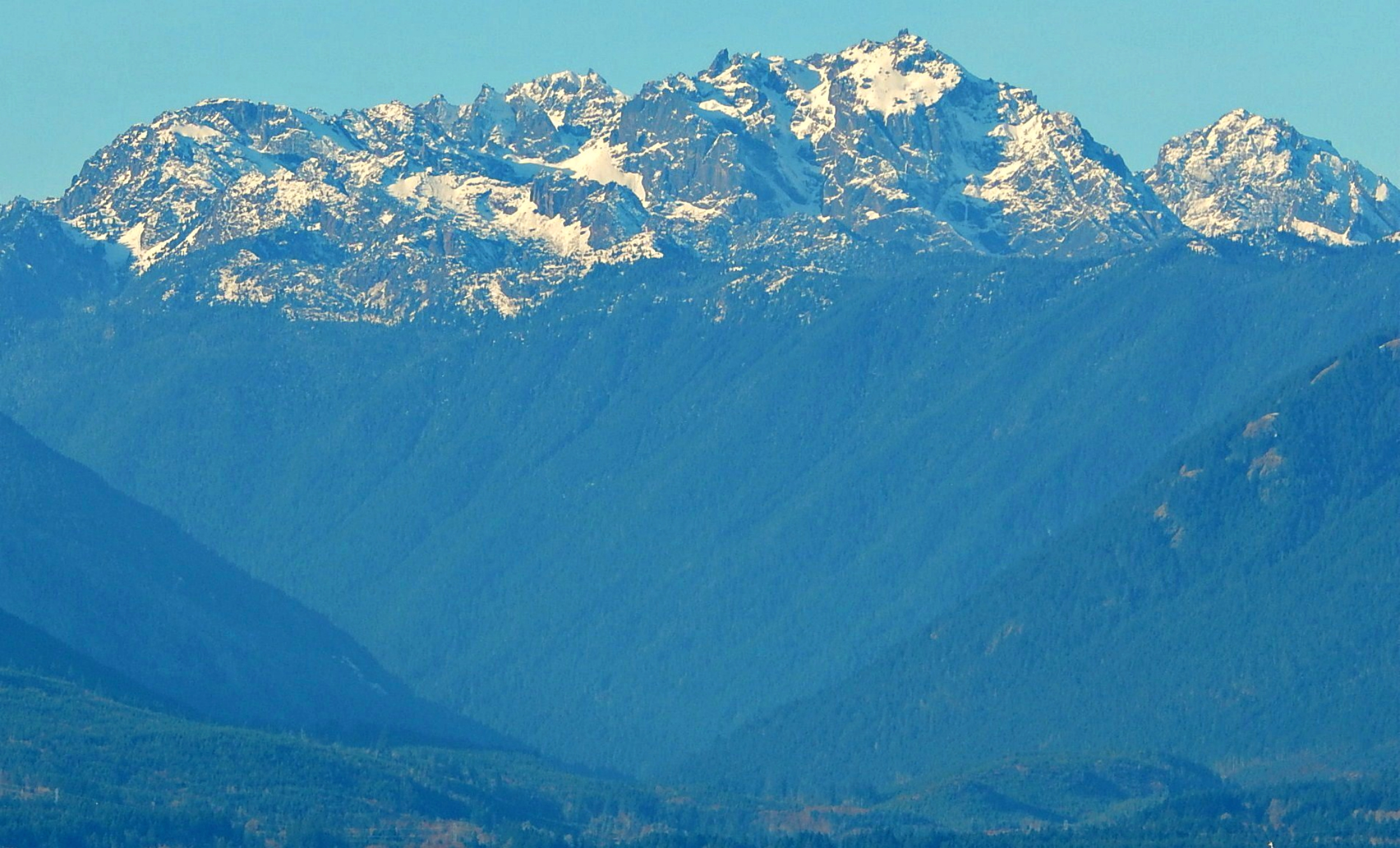
Mt. Constance with Warrior Peak to right

Based on the Köppen climate classification, Warrior Peak is located in the marine west coast climate zone of western North America. Weather fronts originating in the Pacific Ocean travel northeast toward the Olympic Mountains. As fronts approach, they are forced upward by the peaks (orographic lift), causing them to drop their moisture in the form of rain or snow. As a result, the Olympics experience high precipitation, especially during the winter months in the form of snowfall. Because of maritime influence, snow tends to be wet and heavy, resulting in avalanche danger. During winter months weather is usually cloudy, but due to high pressure systems over the Pacific Ocean that intensify during summer months, there is often little or no cloud cover during the summer. The months of July through September offer the most favorable weather for climbing the mountain.

== Geology ==
The Olympic Mountains are composed of obducted clastic wedge material and oceanic crust, primarily Eocene sandstone, turbidite, and basaltic oceanic crust. The mountains were sculpted during the Pleistocene era by erosion and glaciers advancing and retreating multiple times.

== See also ==
- Geology of the Pacific Northwest
- Geography of Washington (state)
