= Tubal Cain mine =

Abandoned copper mine in the Buckhorn Wilderness, Washington

Coordinates: 47°51.179′N 123°5.767′W

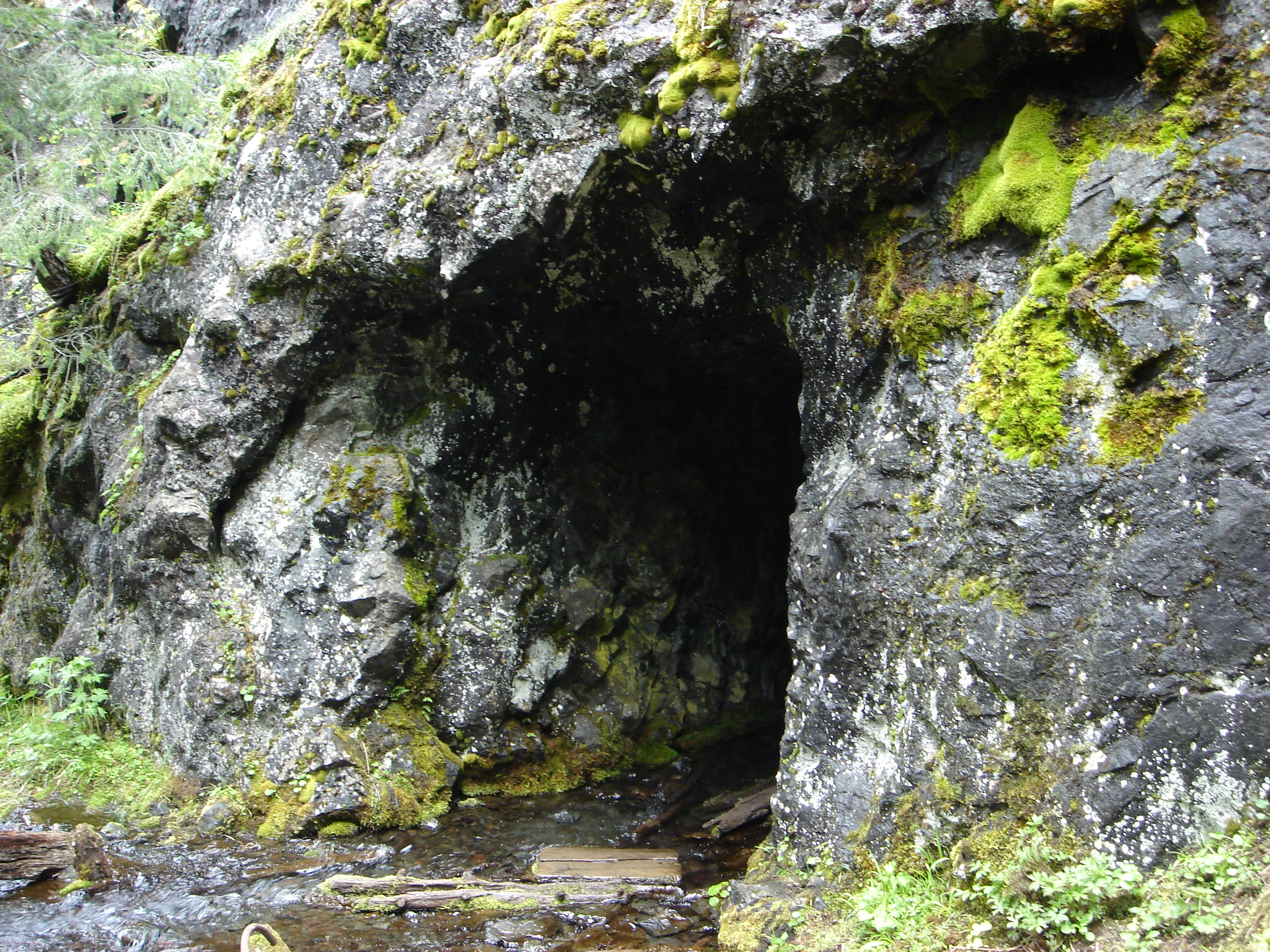
Tubal Cain Mine

Tubal Cain Mine is an abandoned copper mine in the Buckhorn Wilderness, east of Olympic National Park in the US state of Washington. The main adit penetrates 450 meters into Mount Worthington.

The mine is named after Tubal-Cain, a character mentioned in the Bible. The Book of Genesis 4:22 says that Tubal-cain was a "forger of all instruments of bronze and iron," a metalsmith.

== History ==
In 1902, copper was discovered in the Dungeness River drainage. The ore was said to have both copper and gold. Later that year, the Tubal-Cain Copper & Manganese Mining Co. headquartered in Seattle built a trail and began to mine ore out of the area. After an avalanche in 1912, which destroyed the main sawmill, powderhouse, and barn and clubhouse, activity at the mine declined. The mine never produced a dime of profit. Most geologists believe upheaval of the Olympic Mountains broke and scattered any large veins or pods of ore that may have existed. The mine produced hints of low-grade ore, and was abandoned in the early 1920s.

Two camps were established: Copper City at the bottom of Mt. Buckhorn, and Tull City located in Tull Canyon. Evidence of these camps such as metal boilers, wire, a Pelton wheel, and old cabin foundations are still visible today.
