= Iron Mountain (Jefferson County, Washington) =

Mountain in Washington, USA

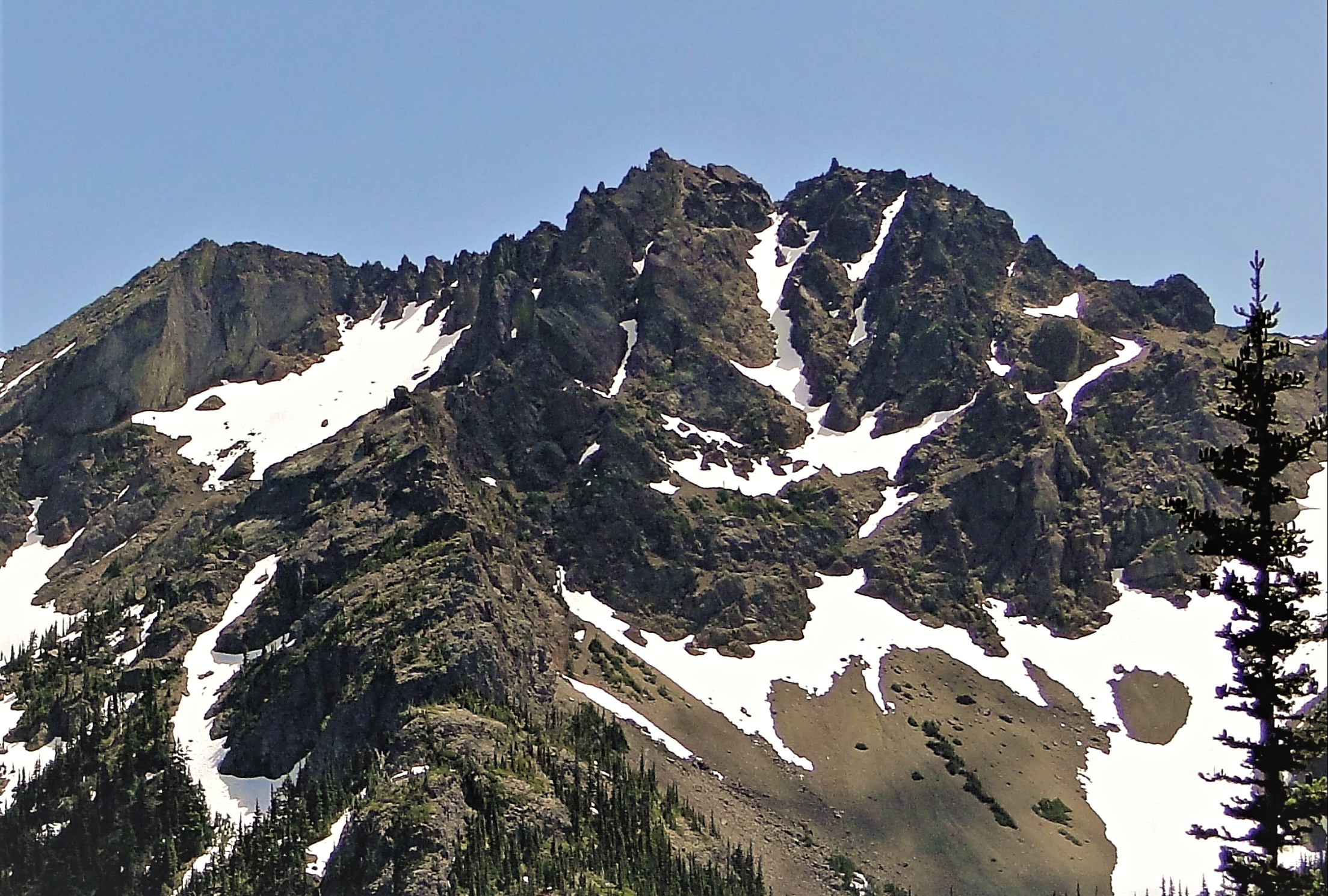
- Northwest aspect

Highest point
- Elevation: 6,826 ft (2,081 m)
- Prominence: 266 ft (81 m)
- Parent peak: Buckhorn Mountain (6,988 ft)
- Isolation: 0.30 mi (0.48 km)
- Coordinates: 47°49′42″N 123°06′36″W

Geography
- Location within Washington (state) Location within the United States
- Country: United States
- State: Washington
- County: Jefferson
- Protected area: Buckhorn Wilderness
- Parent range: Olympic Mountains
- Topo map: USGS Mount Townsend

Geology
- Rock age: Eocene

Climbing
- First ascent: Unknown
- Easiest route: class 3 scrambling

Iron Mountain is a 6,826-foot (2,081-metre) elevation summit located in the eastern Olympic Mountains in Jefferson County of Washington state. It is set within Buckhorn Wilderness, on land managed by Olympic National Forest. It is situated between Buckhorn Mountain, 0.58 mi (0.93 km) to the southwest, and Mount Worthington, 0.76 mi (1.22 km) to the northeast. Precipitation runoff from Iron Mountain drains south into the Big Quilcene River, and north into Copper Creek which is a tributary of the Dungeness River. Topographic relief is significant as the southeast aspect rises 2,800 feet (850 meters) above the Big Quilcene River in less than one mile, and the north aspect rises 1,700 feet (520 meters) above Buckhorn Lake in one-half mile. Old-growth forests of Douglas fir, western hemlock, and western redcedar grow in the valleys surrounding the peak. The nearest community is Quilcene 11 miles to the east.

== Climate ==
Iron Mountain is located in the marine west coast climate zone of western North America. Weather fronts originating in the Pacific Ocean travel northeast toward the Olympic Mountains. As fronts approach, they are forced upward by the peaks (orographic lift), causing them to drop their moisture in the form of rain or snow. As a result, the Olympics experience high precipitation, especially during the winter months in the form of snowfall. Because of maritime influence, snow tends to be wet and heavy, resulting in avalanche danger. During winter months weather is usually cloudy, but due to high pressure systems over the Pacific Ocean that intensify during summer months, there is often little or no cloud cover during the summer.

== Geology ==
The Olympic Mountains are composed of obducted clastic wedge material and oceanic crust, primarily Eocene sandstone, turbidite, and basaltic oceanic crust. The mountains were sculpted during the Pleistocene era by erosion and glaciers advancing and retreating multiple times.

== Gallery ==
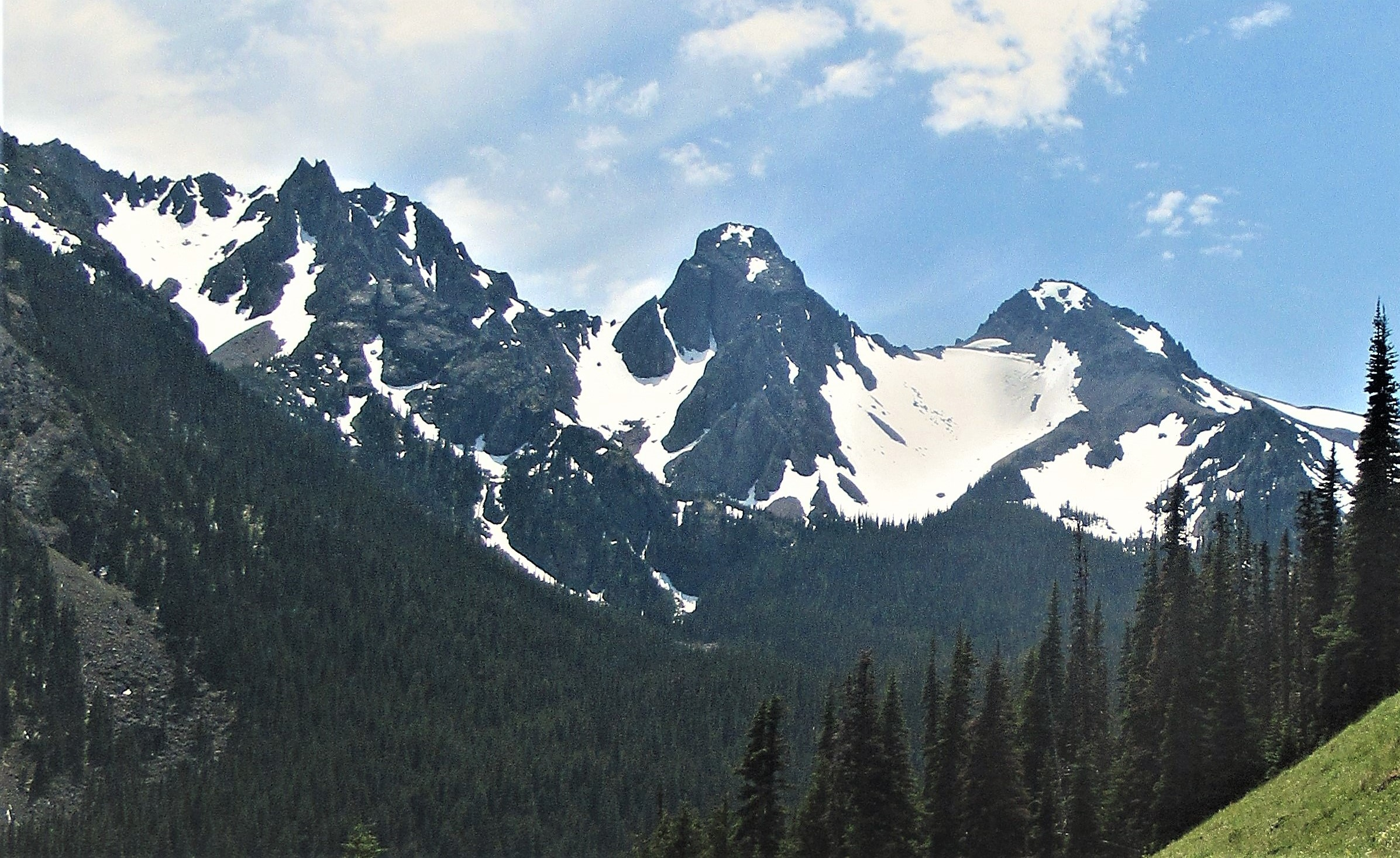
Iron Mountain (left) and Buckhorn Mountain (center and right) seen from the north along Tubal Cain Trail.

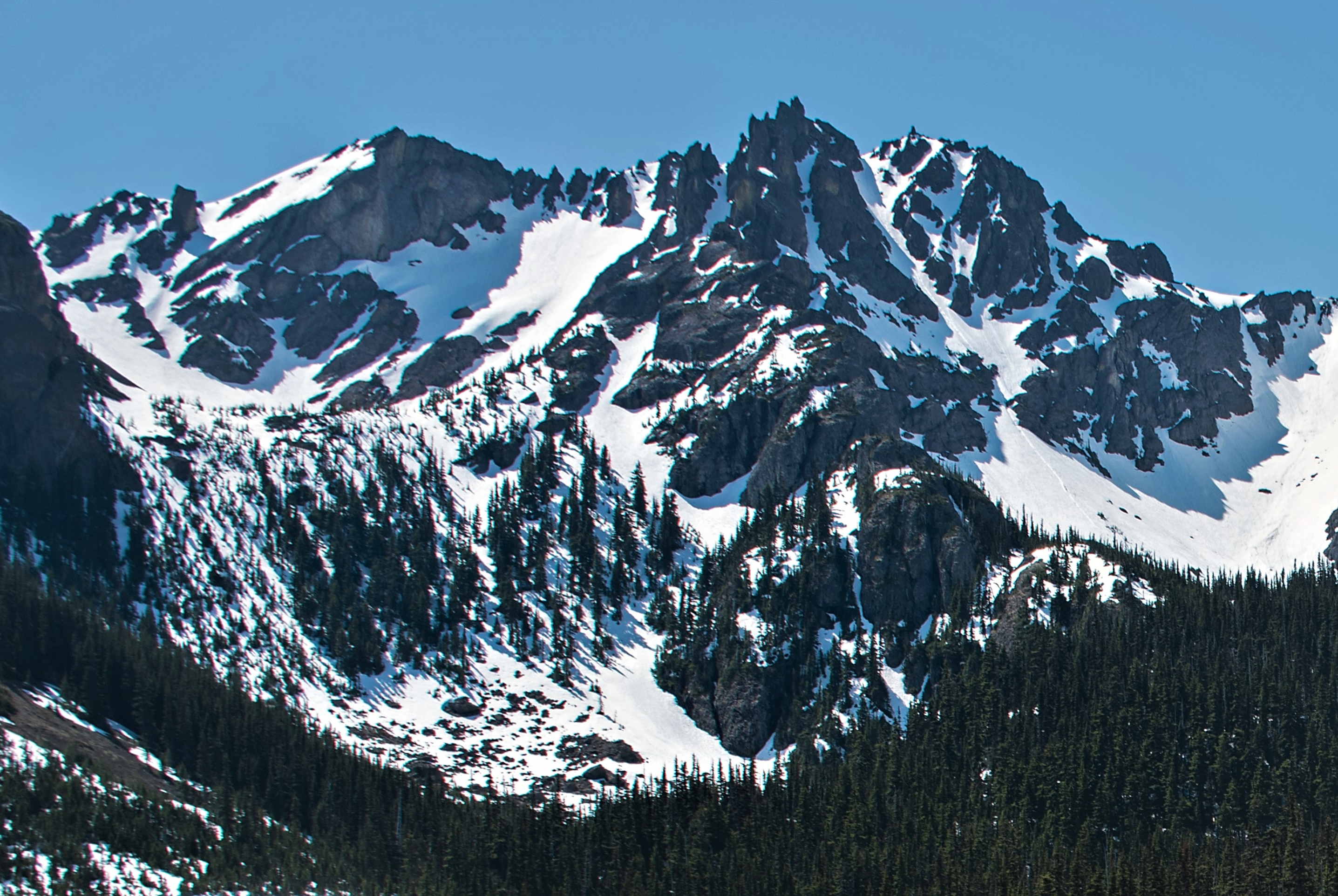
Northwest aspect

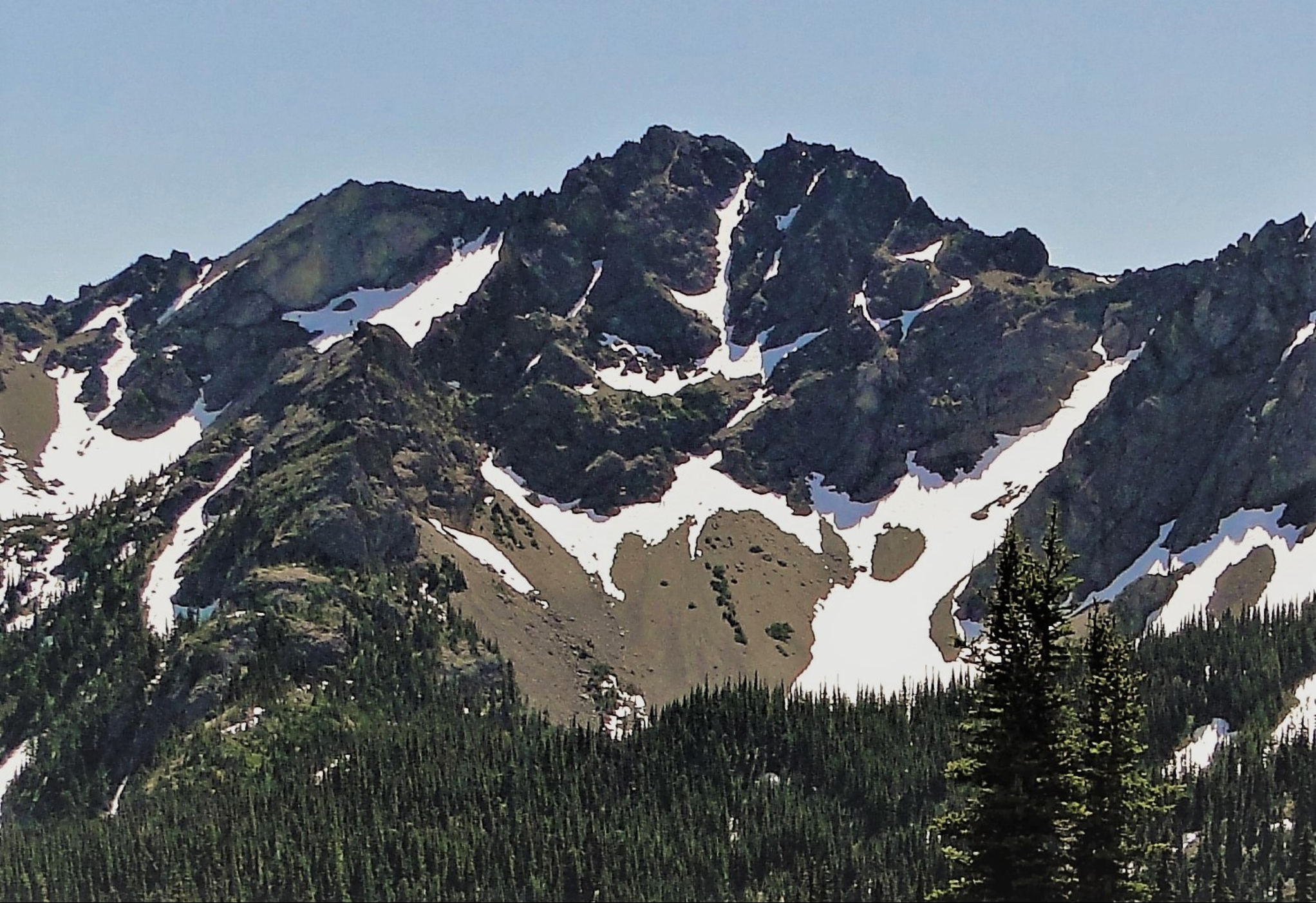
Northwest aspect

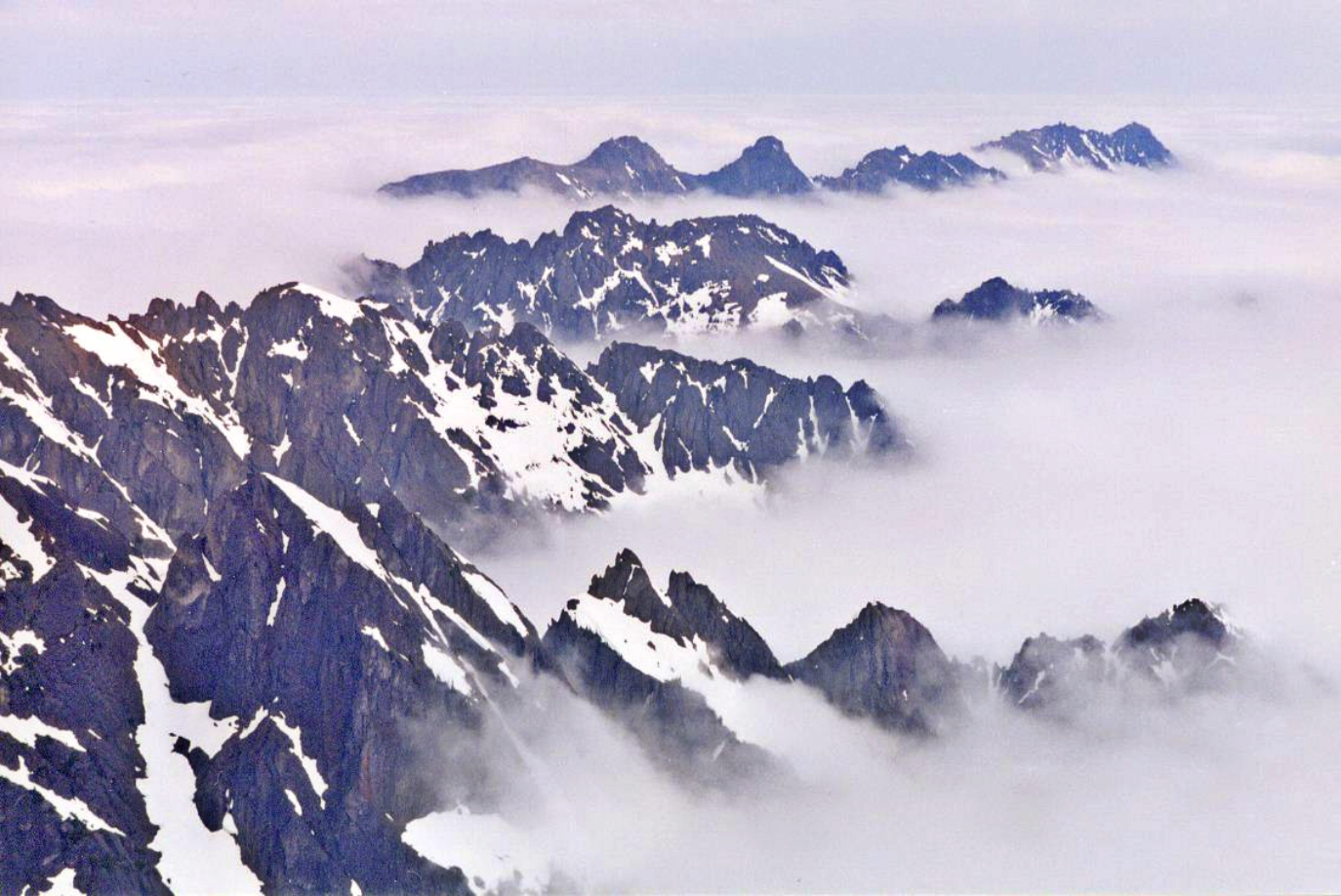
View from Mount Constance with Buckhorn, Iron, and Worthington at top

== See also ==
- Geology of the Pacific Northwest
