= Inner Constance =

Mountain in Washington (state), United States

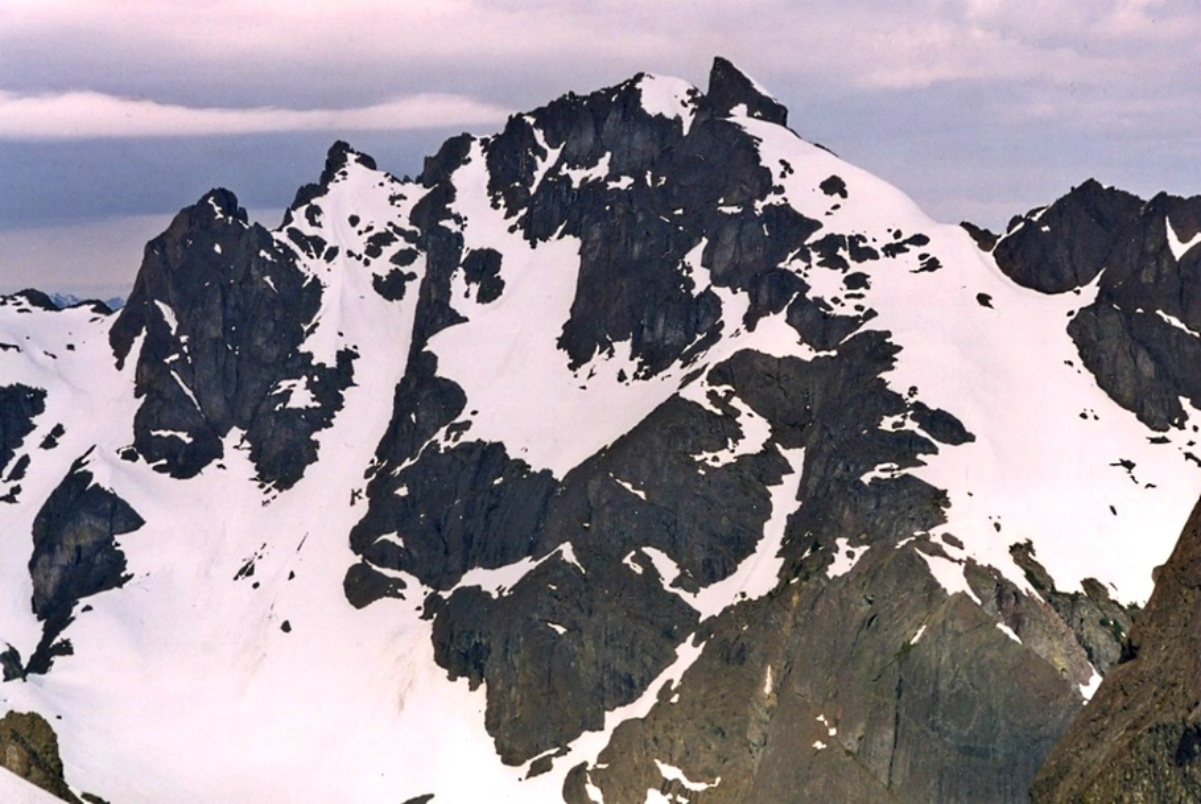
- Inner Constance seen from Mount Constance

Highest point
- Elevation: 7,670 ft (2,338 m)
- Prominence: 1,150 ft (351 m)
- Coordinates: 47°46′12″N 123°08′47″W

Geography
- Location within Washington (state) Location within the United States
- Country: United States
- State: Washington
- County: Jefferson
- Protected area: Olympic National Park
- Parent range: Olympic Mountains
- Topo map: USGS Mount Deception

Geology
- Rock age: Eocene
- Rock type: Tilted pillow Basalt

Climbing
- First ascent: 1939, David Harrah and party
- Easiest route: Climbing

Inner Constance is a summit of the Olympic Mountains and is located in Jefferson County of Washington state. It is located near the eastern edge of Olympic National Park on the Olympic Peninsula. At 7,670 feet (2,338 m), Inner Constance is the fifth-highest peak of the Olympic Mountains, after Mount Olympus, Mount Deception, Mount Constance, and Mount Johnson. Its nearest higher neighbor is Mount Constance, 0.9 mi (1.4 km) to the east. Within this nearly mile-wide separation resides a deep glacially carved canyon called "Avalanche Canyon". Precipitation runoff on the north side of the peak drains into tributaries of the Dungeness River, whereas the south side drains into tributaries of the Dosewallips River.

== Climate ==
Inner Constance is located in the eastern portion of the Olympic Mountains. This location results in less precipitation than Mount Olympus and the western Olympics receive. Inner Constance is located in the marine west coast climate zone of western North America. Weather fronts originating in the Pacific Ocean travel northeast toward the Olympic Mountains. As fronts approach, they are forced upward by the peaks (orographic lift), causing them to drop their moisture in the form of rain or snow. As a result, the Olympics experience high precipitation, especially during the winter months in the form of snowfall. Because of maritime influence, snow tends to be wet and heavy, resulting in avalanche danger. During winter months weather is usually cloudy, but due to high pressure systems over the Pacific Ocean that intensify during summer months, there is often little or no cloud cover during the summer.

== Geology ==
The Olympic Mountains are composed of obducted clastic wedge material and oceanic crust, primarily Eocene sandstone, turbidite, and basaltic oceanic crust. The mountains were sculpted during the Pleistocene era by erosion and glaciers advancing and retreating multiple times.

== See also ==
- Olympic Mountains
- Geology of the Pacific Northwest
- Geography of Washington (state)

== Gallery ==
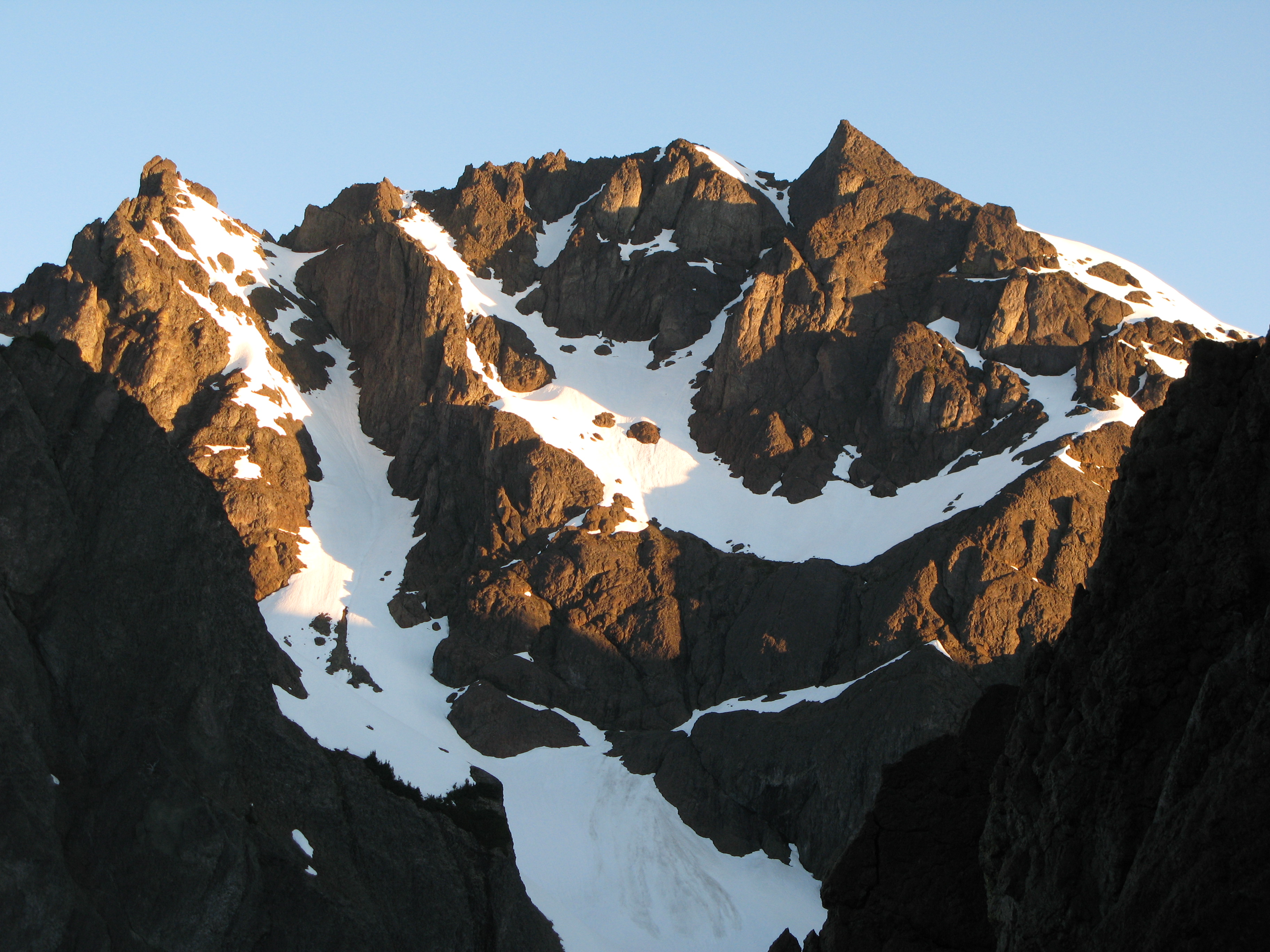
Morning on Inner Constance

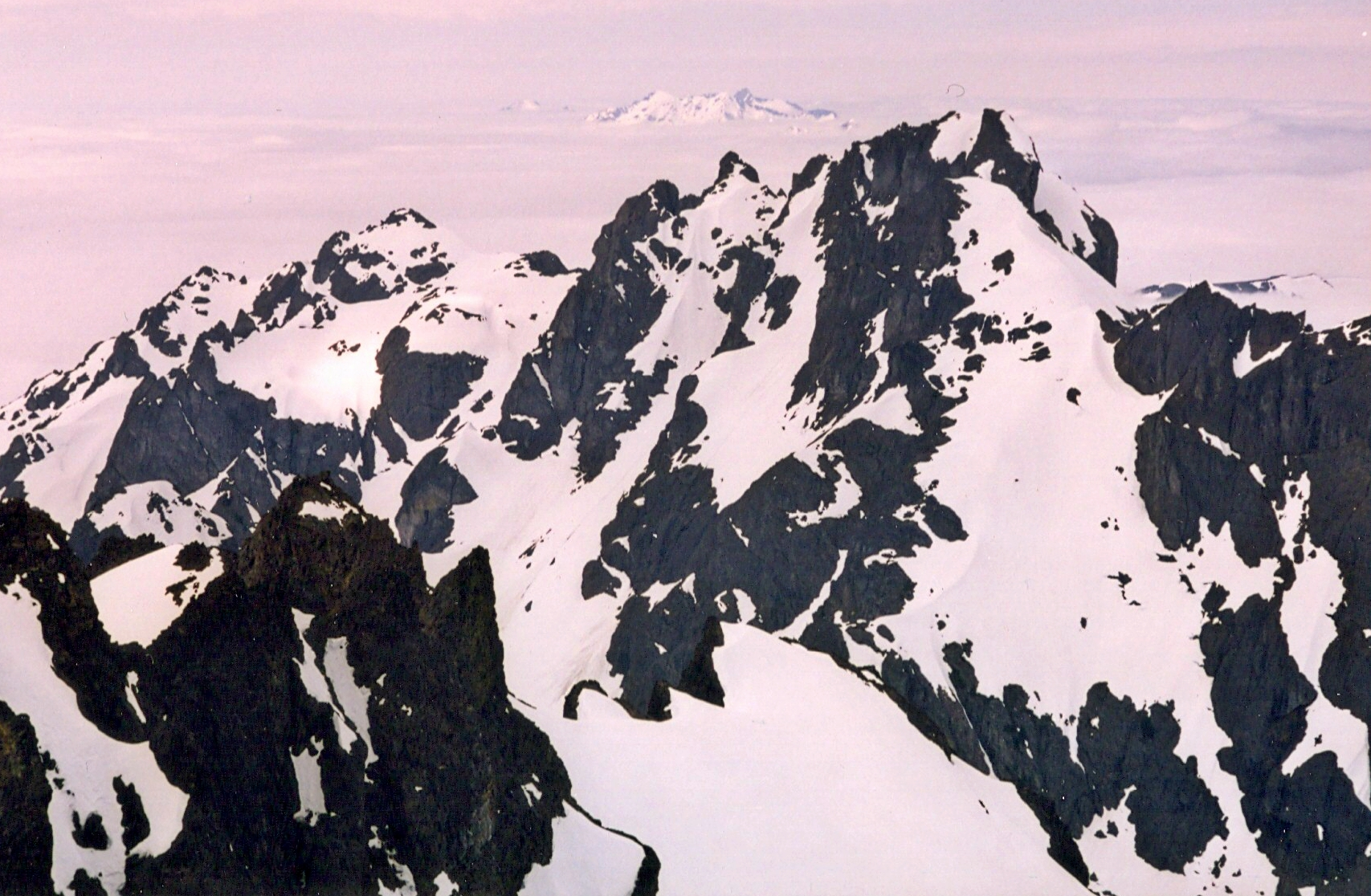
Inner Constance above the weather
