= Buckhorn Mountain =

Mountain in Washington (state), United States

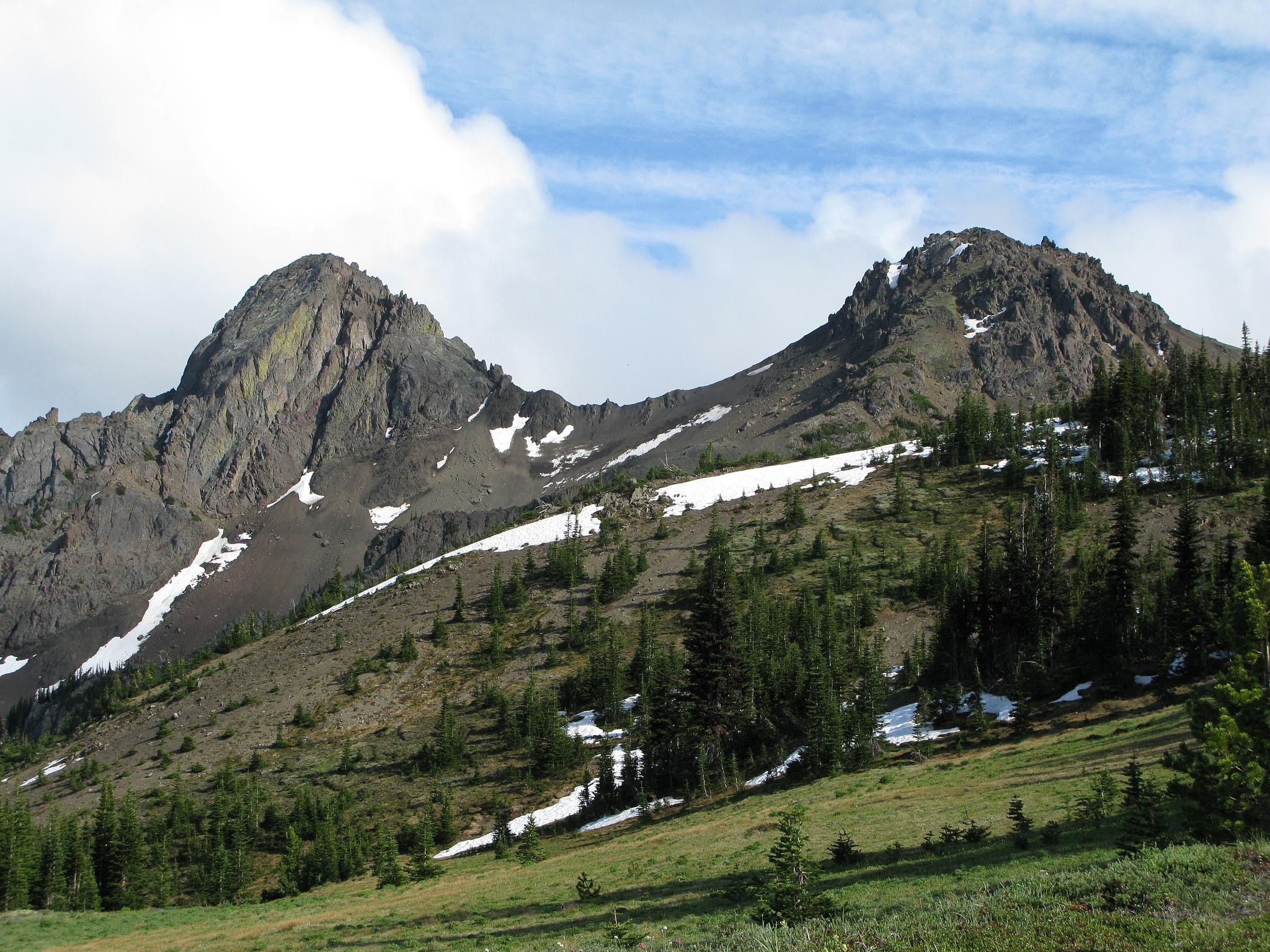

Highest point
- Elevation: 6,988 ft (2,130 m)
- Prominence: 988 ft (301 m)
- Coordinates: 47°49′32″N 123°07′19″W

Geography
- Location within Washington (state)
- Location: Jefferson County, Washington, United States
- Parent range: Olympic Mountains

Buckhorn Mountain is a peak in the Olympic Mountains in the U.S. state of Washington. It is in Olympic National Forest on the Olympic Peninsula.

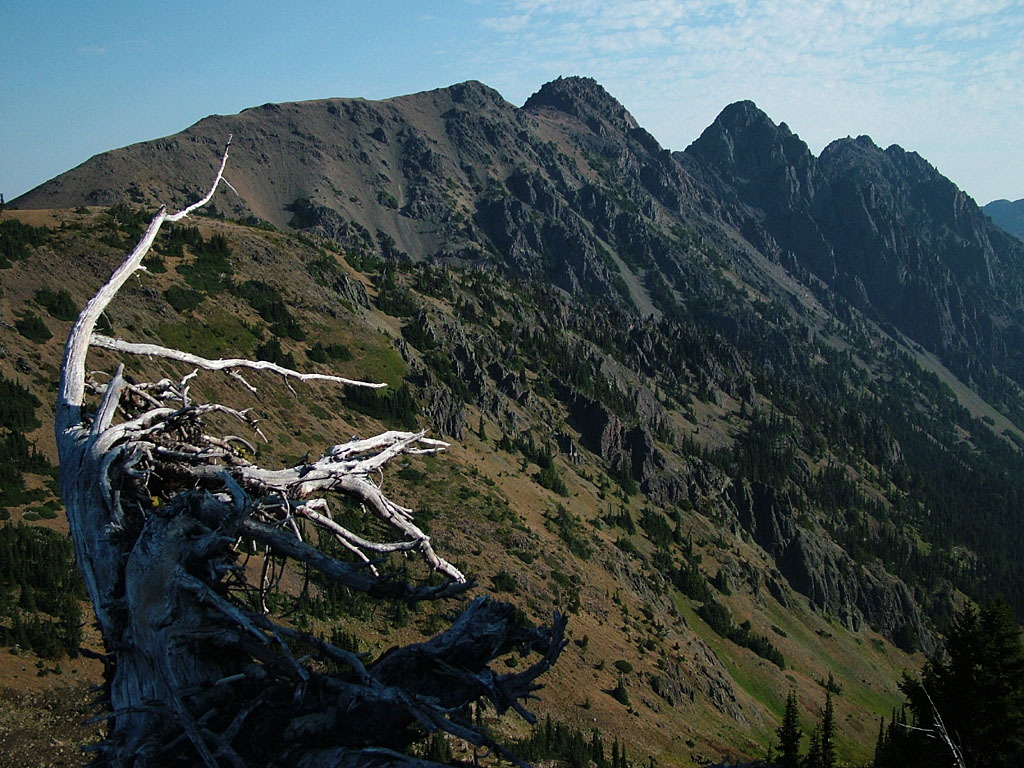
Buckhorn Mountain as seen from the southwest

== Description ==
At 6,988 feet (2,130 m) high Buckhorn Mountain is the 23rd highest peak of the Olympic Mountains.

== See also ==
- List of mountains of the United States
- Iron Mountain
