= Welch Peaks =

Mountain in Washington, USA

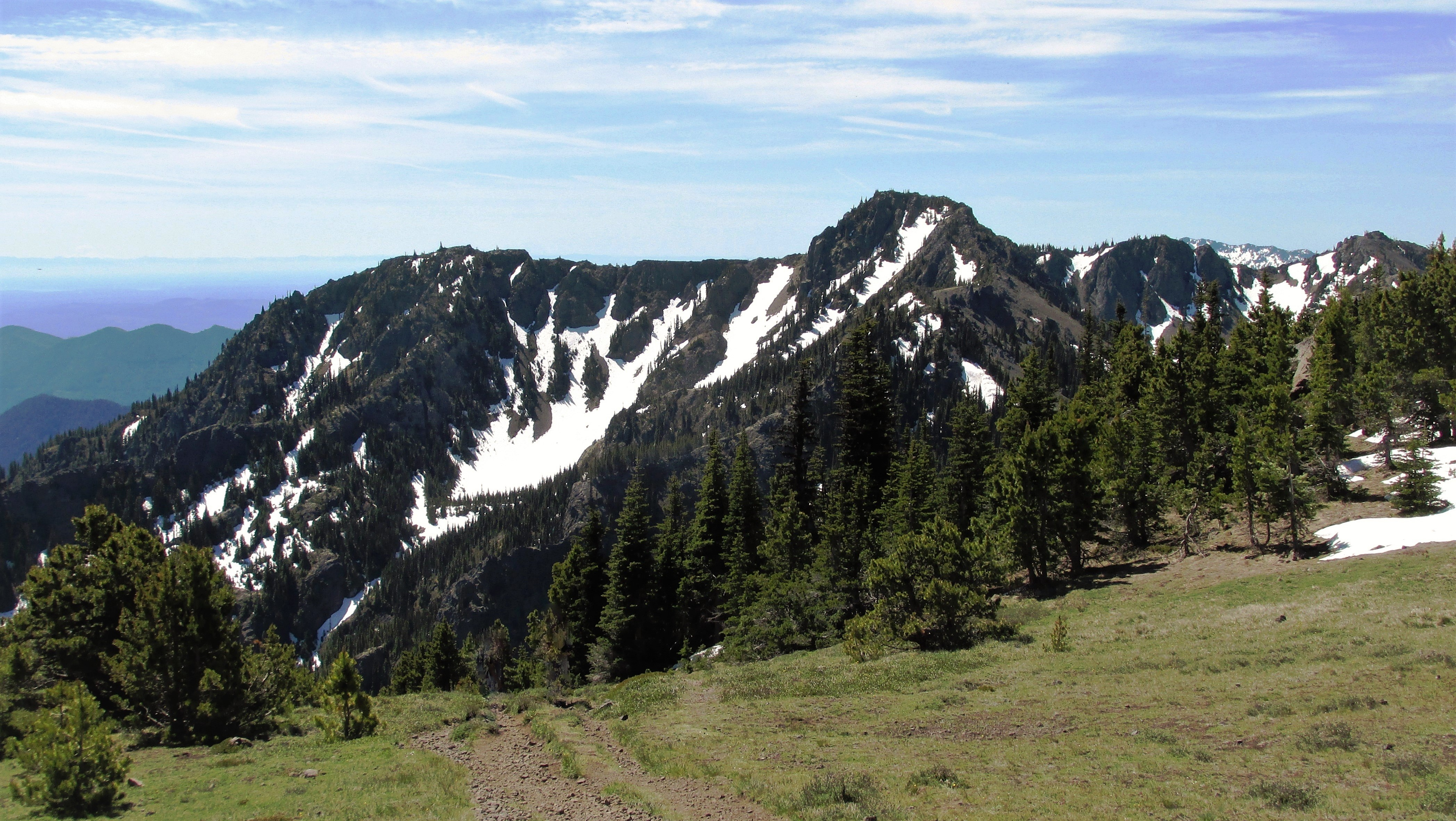
- North aspect, seen from Mt. Townsend trail

Highest point
- Elevation: 6,110 ft (1,862 m)
- Prominence: 350 ft (107 m)
- Parent peak: Mount Townsend (6,243 ft)
- Isolation: 1.17 mi (1.88 km)
- Coordinates: 47°50′42″N 123°03′50″W

Geography
- Location within Washington (state) Location within the United States
- Country: United States
- State: Washington
- County: Jefferson
- Protected area: Buckhorn Wilderness
- Parent range: Olympic Mountains
- Topo map: USGS Mount Townsend

Geology
- Rock age: Eocene

Climbing
- Easiest route: class 2 scrambling

Welch Peaks is a 6,110-foot (1,862-metre) mountain in the eastern Olympic Mountains in Jefferson County of Washington state, United States. It is set within Buckhorn Wilderness, on land managed by the Olympic National Forest. The nearest higher neighbor is Mount Townsend, 1.2 mi (1.9 km) to the north, and Mount Worthington rises 2.1 mi (3.4 km) to the southwest. Precipitation runoff from Welch Peaks drains into tributaries of the Big Quilcene River, and Silver Creek which is a tributary of the Dungeness River. Topographic relief is significant as the summit rises 3,100 feet (945 m) above Townsend Creek in approximately one mile. The mountain's toponym was officially adopted in 1963 by the U.S. Board on Geographic Names.

== Climate ==
Welch Peaks is in the marine west coast climate zone of western North America. Weather fronts originating in the Pacific Ocean travel northeast toward the Olympic Mountains. As fronts approach, they are forced upward by the peaks (orographic lift), causing them to drop their moisture in the form of rain or snow. As a result, the Olympics experience high precipitation, especially during the winter months in the form of snowfall. Because of maritime influence, snow tends to be wet and heavy, resulting in avalanche danger. During winter months weather is usually cloudy, but due to high pressure systems over the Pacific Ocean that intensify during summer months, there is often little or no cloud cover during the summer.

== Geology ==
The Olympic Mountains are composed of obducted clastic wedge material and oceanic crust, primarily Eocene sandstone, turbidite, and basaltic oceanic crust. The mountains were sculpted during the Pleistocene era by erosion and glaciers advancing and retreating multiple times.

== Gallery ==
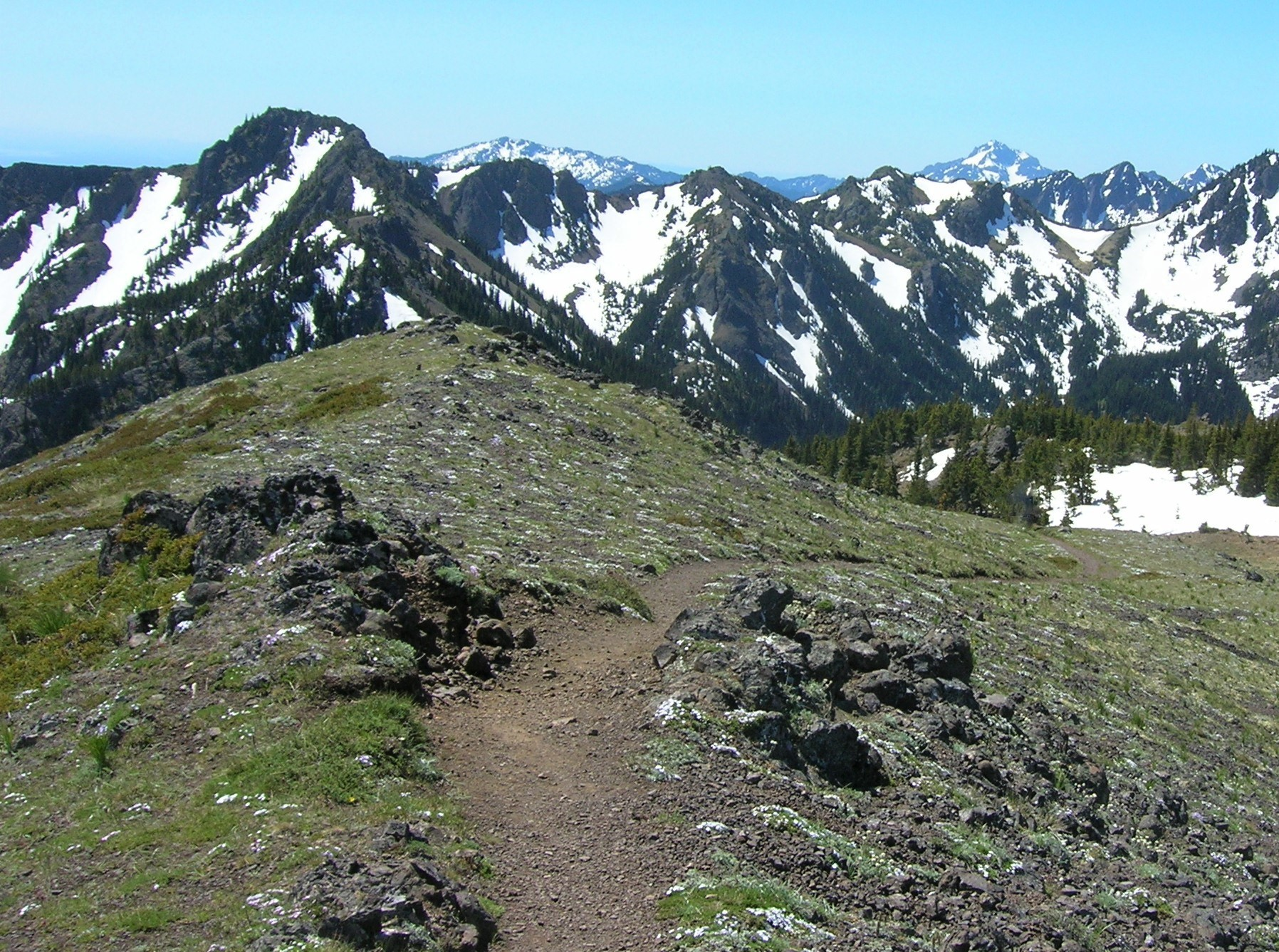
Welch Peaks seen from Mt. Townsend trail

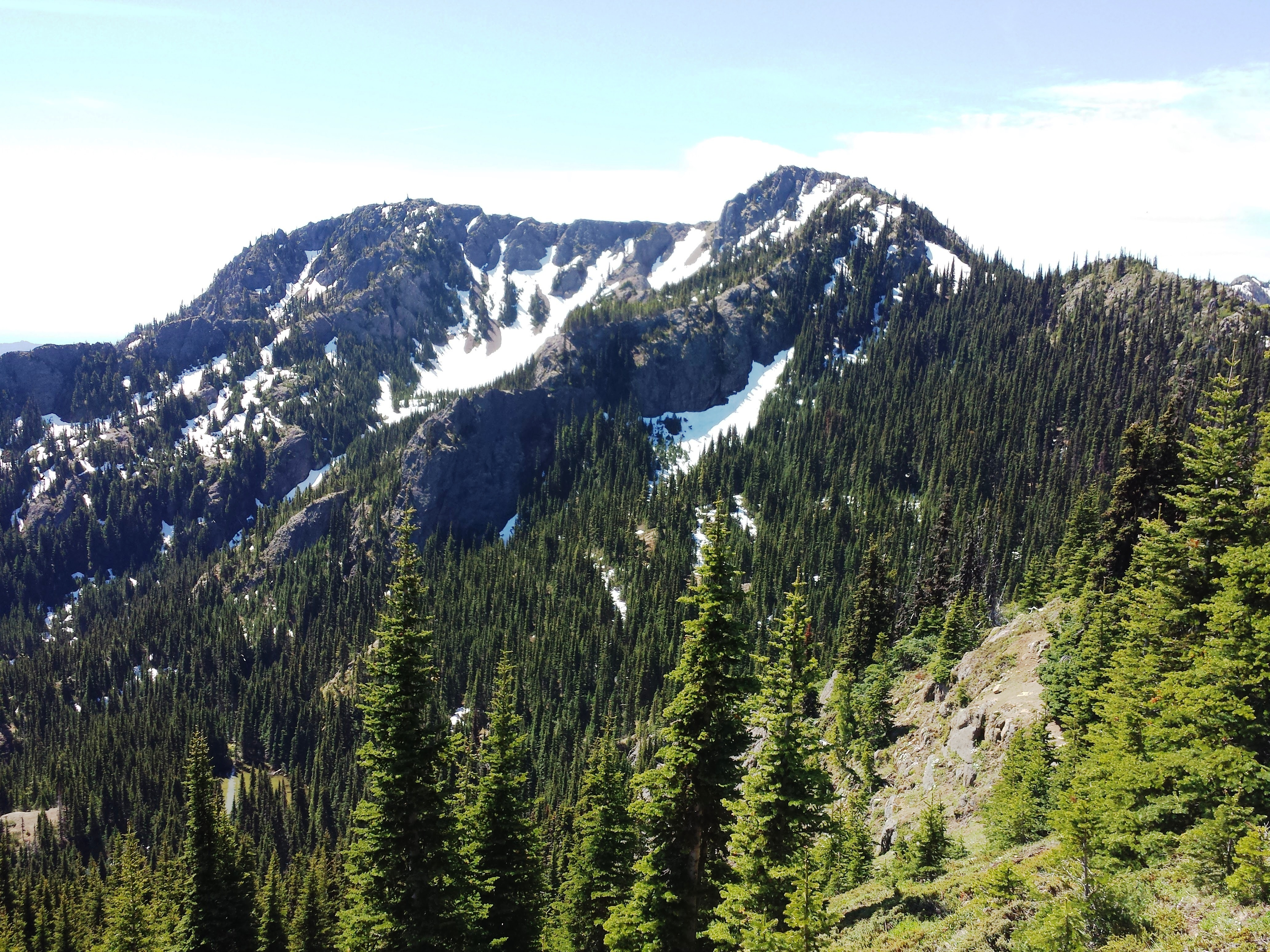
Welch Peaks

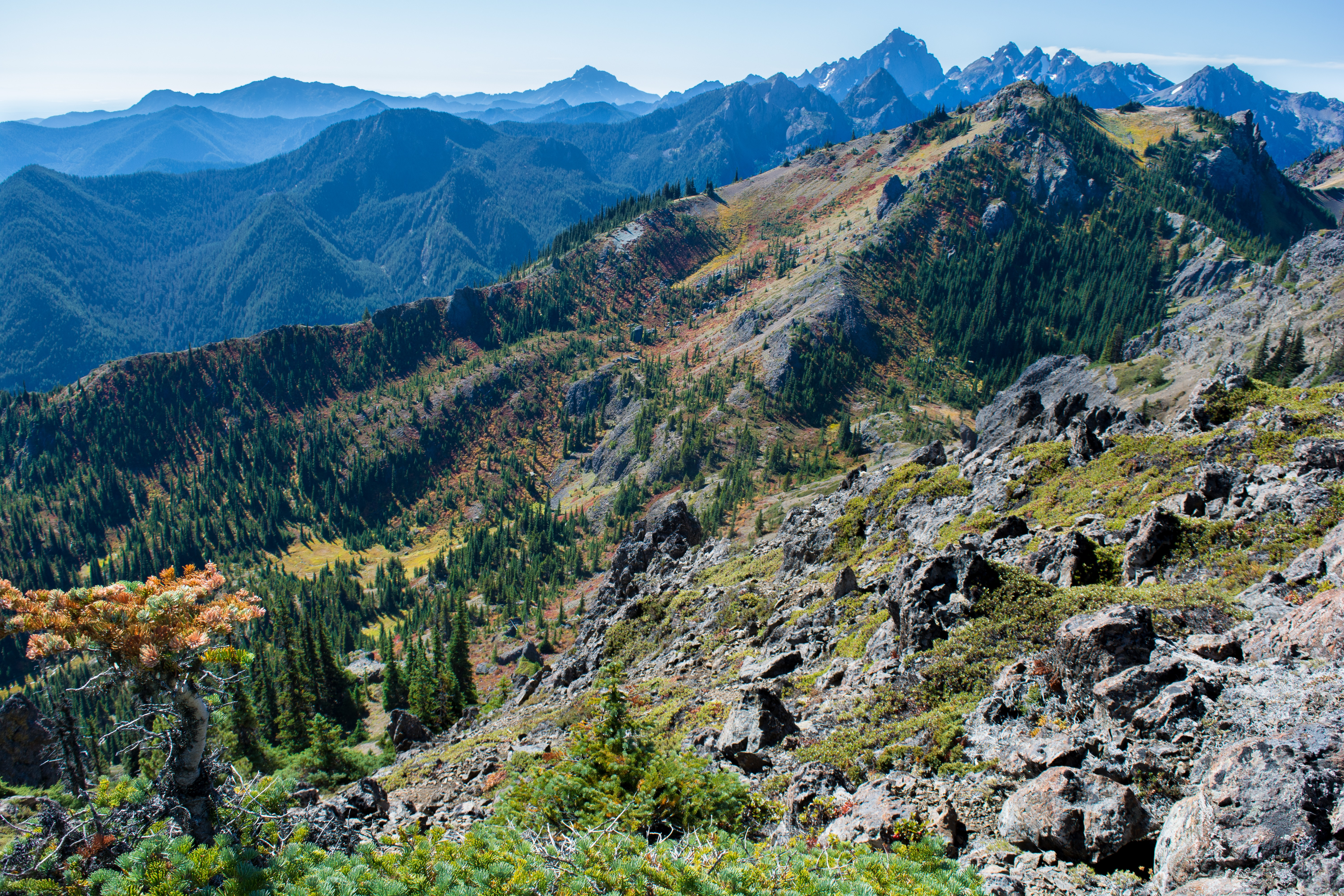
Fall colors on Welch Peaks

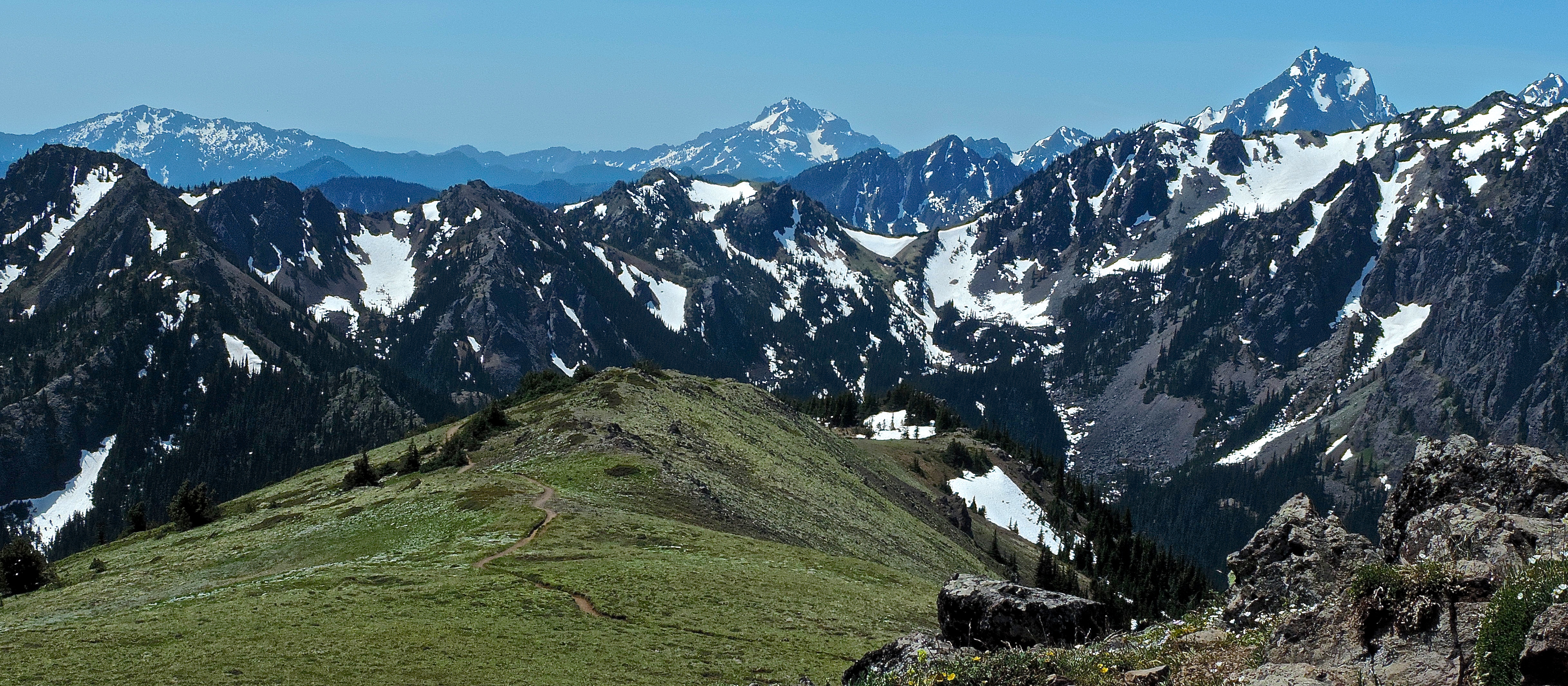
Welch Peaks (left) from Mount Townsend

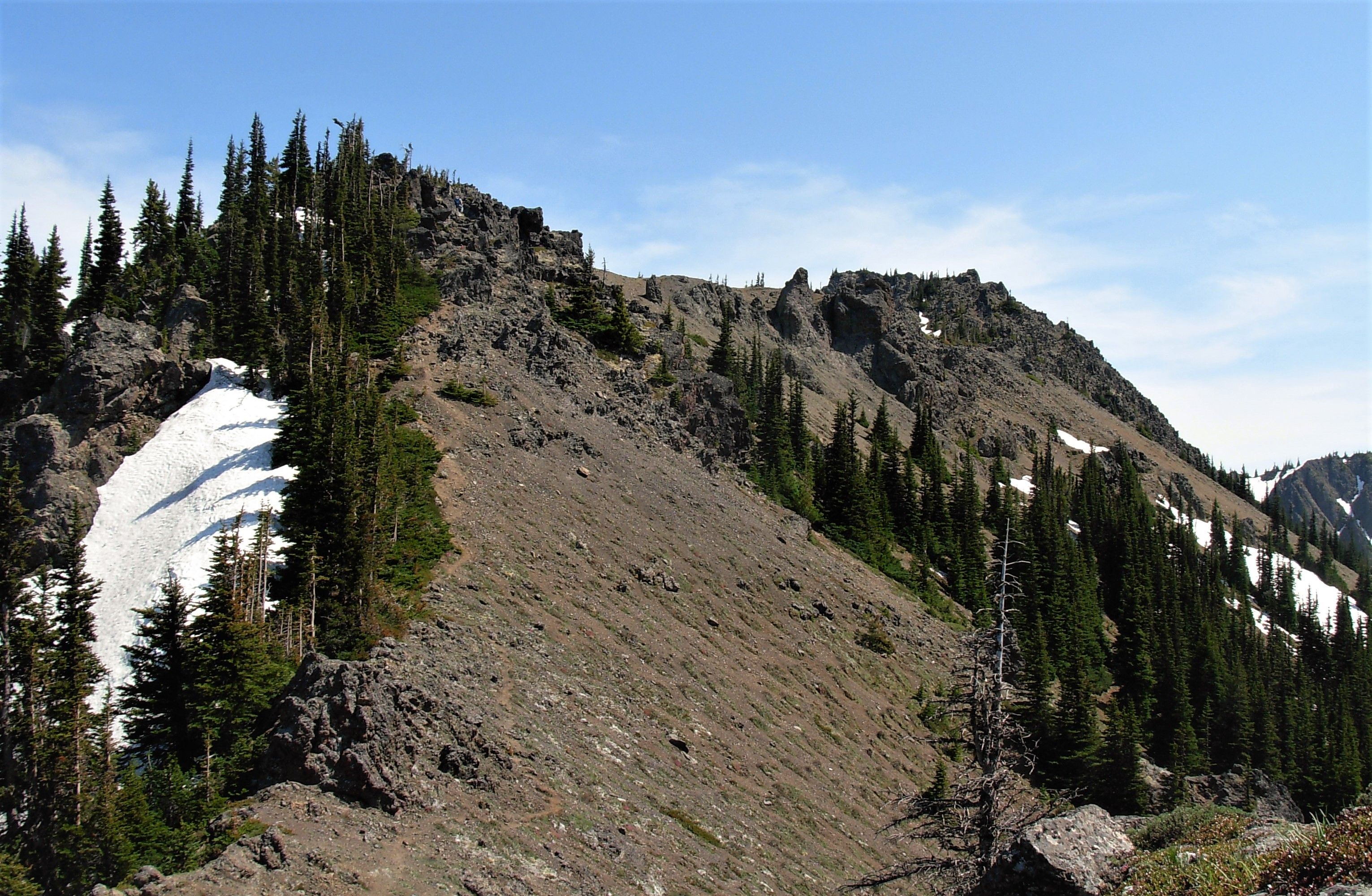
Looking south towards Welch Peak

== See also ==
- Geology of the Pacific Northwest
- Olympic Mountains
