= Mount Townsend (Washington) =

Mountain in Jefferson (county) Washington (state), United States

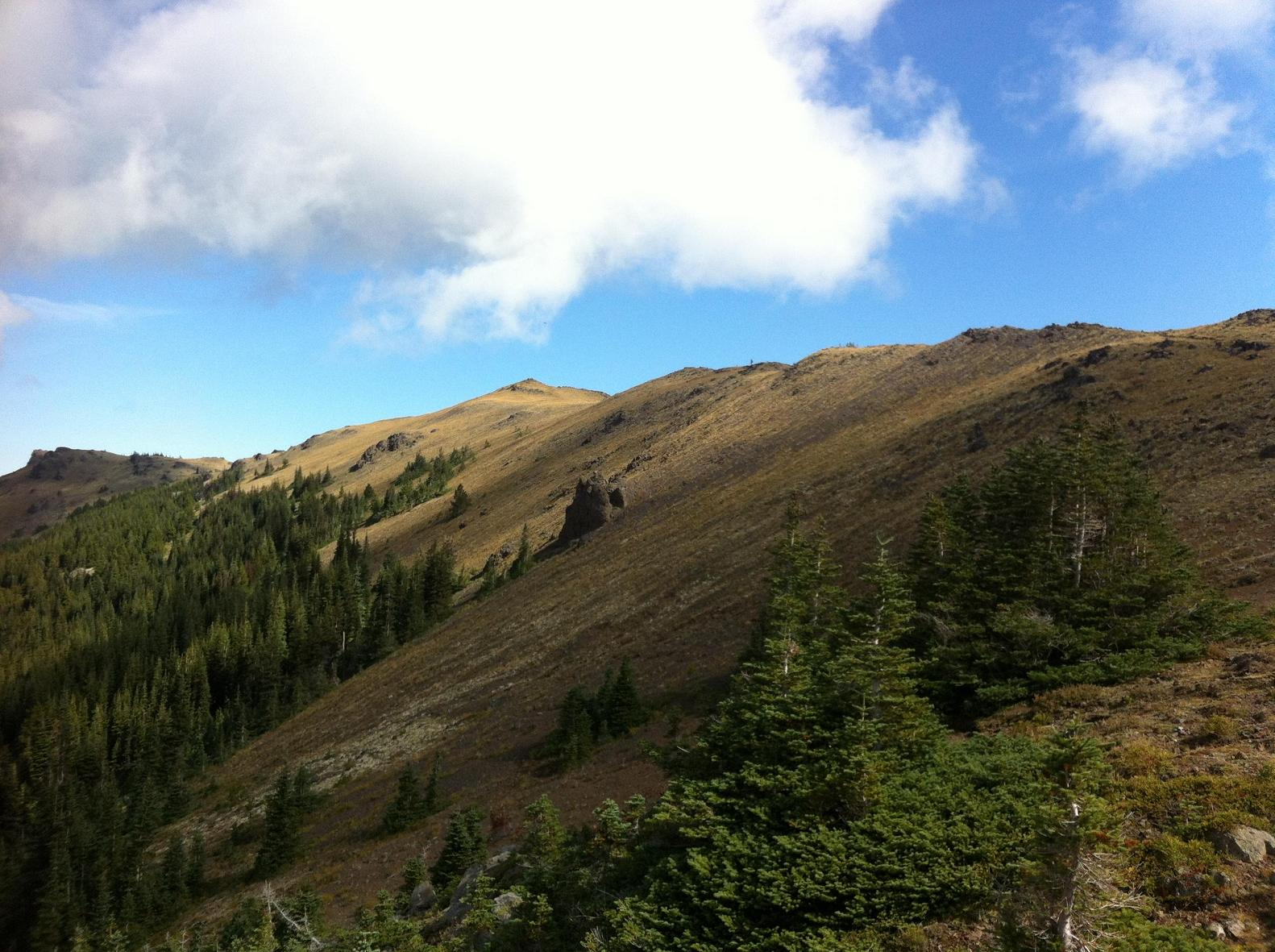
- Summit from the Mt. Townsend Trail.

Highest point
- Elevation: 6,243 ft (1,903 m)
- Prominence: 600 ft (180 m)
- Coordinates: 47°52′01″N 123°03′35″W

Geography
- Location within Washington (state) Location within the United States
- Country: United States
- State: Washington
- County: Jefferson
- Protected area: Buckhorn Wilderness
- Parent range: Olympic Mountains
- Topo map: USGS Mount Townsend

Climbing
- Easiest route: Mt. Townsend Trail

Mount Townsend is a mountain in the U.S state of Washington located within the Buckhorn Wilderness near Quilcene.

== Recreation ==
The Mt. Townsend Trail rises from the trailhead to the summit, a rise of 3,010 ft (920 m). The summit affords a 360 degree view of the area.

== Climate ==
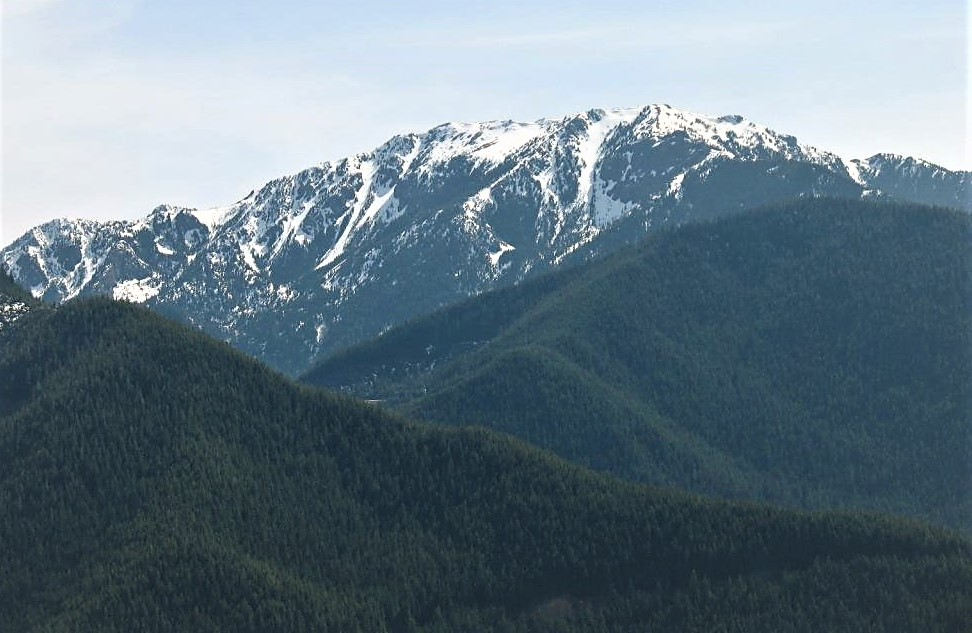
Townsend from northeast at Mt. Zion

Mount Townsend is located in the marine west coast climate zone of western North America. Weather fronts originating in the Pacific Ocean travel northeast toward the Olympic Mountains. As fronts approach, they are forced upward by the peaks (orographic lift), causing them to drop their moisture in the form of rain or snow. As a result, the Olympics experience high precipitation, especially during the winter months in the form of snowfall. Because of maritime influence, snow tends to be wet and heavy, resulting in avalanche danger. During winter months weather is usually cloudy, but due to high pressure systems over the Pacific Ocean that intensify during summer months, there is often little or no cloud cover during the summer.

== Geology ==
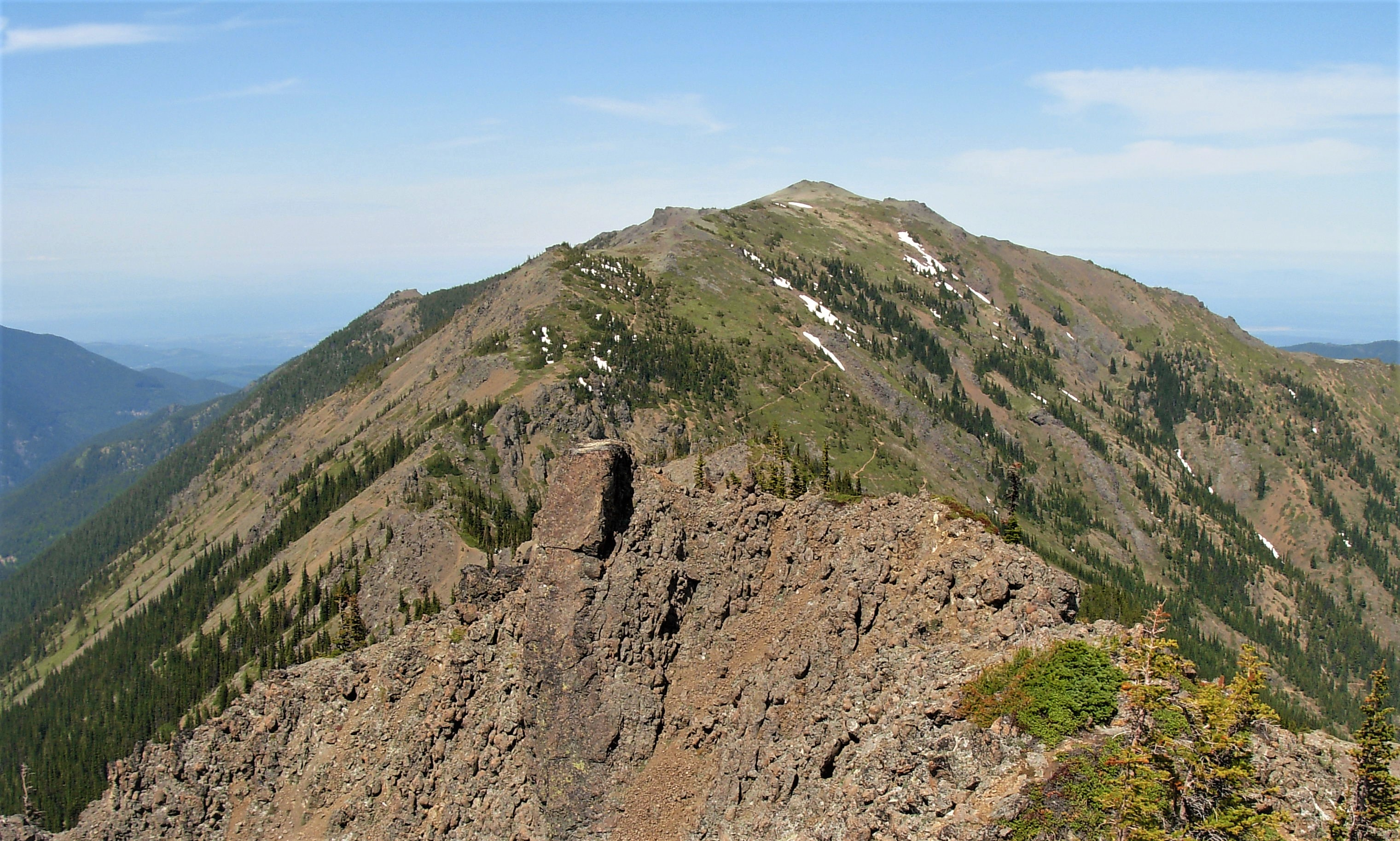
South aspect

The Olympic Mountains are composed of obducted clastic wedge material and oceanic crust, primarily Eocene sandstone, turbidite, and basaltic oceanic crust. The mountains were sculpted during the Pleistocene era by erosion and glaciers advancing and retreating multiple times.

== See also ==
- Geology of the Pacific Northwest
- Welch Peaks
